= 2026 Arkansas House of Representatives election =

- November 3, 2026

All 100 seats in the Arkansas House of Representatives 51 seats needed for a majority
| | Majority party | Minority party |
|---|---|---|
| Leader | Brian S. Evans | Andrew Collins |
| Party | Republican | Democratic |
| Leader since | January 13, 2025 | January 13, 2025 |
| Leader's seat | 68th–Cabot | 73rd–Little Rock |
| Last election | 81 | 19 |
| Seats before | 80 | 20 |
| Seats won | 70 | 30 |
| Seat change | ▼10 | ▲10 |
| Popular vote | 556,269 | 220,995 |
| Percentage | 70.15% | 27.87% |
- Democratic Gain Democratic hold Republican hold
Speaker before election
Brian S. Evans
Republican
Elected Speaker
TBD

The 2026 Arkansas House of Representatives election was held on November 3, 2026, alongside the other 2026 United States elections. Voters elected members of the Arkansas House of Representatives in all 100 of the U.S. state of Arkansas's state house districts to serve a two-year term.

Major party candidates had until November 11, 2025 to submit their candidacies to appear on the primary election ballot. Candidates for newly-created political parties had until March 3, 2026, primary election day, to file to appear on the general election ballot, and independent candidates have until May 1, 2026 to petition to be placed on the ballot. The Libertarian Party of Arkansas has successfully filed a petition to be placed on the ballot and has fielded four state house candidates. The primary elections took place on March 3, 2026, and in races where no candidate received over 50% in a primary, runoff elections took place on March 31, 2026.

This election took place alongside races for U.S. Senate, U.S. House, governor, state senate, and numerous other state and local offices.

== Retirements ==
=== Republican ===
1. District 1: Jeremy Wooldridge retired to run for state senate in District 21.
2. District 5: Ron McNair retired.
3. District 6: Harlan Breaux retired.
4. District 42: Stephen Meeks term-limited.
5. District 46: Jon S. Eubanks term-limited.
6. District 70: Carlton Wing announced retirement but then resigned early.
7. District 71: Brandon Achor retired to run for state senate in District 13.
8. District 92: Julie Mayberry retired.
9. District 94: Jeff Wardlaw term-limited.
10. District 97: Matthew Shepherd term-limited.
11. District 99: Lane Jean term-limited.

=== Democratic ===
1. District 20: Denise Garner retired to run for state senate in District 30.
2. District 35: Jessie McGruder retired to run for state senate in District 9.
3. District 72: Tracy Steele term-limited.
4. District 77: Fred Allen term-limited.
5. District 79: Tara Shephard retired to run for state senate in District 15.

== Special elections ==
| District | County(ies) | Contest | Incumbent | Winner | Result | Cause |
|---|---|---|---|---|---|---|
| 70th | Pulaski (p) | March 3, 2026 | Carlton Wing (R) | Alex Holladay (D) | Democratic gain | Incumbent representative resigned September 30, 2025, to become executive director of Arkansas PBS. |
| 44th | Pope (p) and Van Buren (p) | August 4, 2026 | Stan Berry (R) | Bill Teeter (R) | Republican hold | Incumbent representative passed away March 23, 2026. |

== Incumbents defeated ==
=== General election ===
- District 10: Republican Mindy McAlindon was defeated by Democrat Jacob Allen
- District 11: Republican Rebecca Burkes was defeated by Democrat Rey Hernandez
- District 13: Republican Scott Richardson was defeated by Democrat Mitchell Smith
- District 15: Republican John P. Carr was defeated by Democrat Daniel Holtmeyer
- District 19: Republican Steve Unger was defeated by Democrat Jamie Atkinson
- District 32: Republican Jack Ladyman was defeated by Democrat Erika Askeland
- District 55: Republican Matthew Brown was defeated by Democrat Cynthia Nations
- District 62: Republican Mark McElroy was defeated by Democrat Dexter Miller
- District 67: Republican Karilyn Brown was defeated by Democrat Cade Eberly
- District 71: Republican Brandon Achor was defeated by Democrat Cassandra Mayes

== Predictions ==
| Source | Ranking | As of |
|---|---|---|
| Sabato's Crystal Ball | Safe R | January 22, 2026 |
| State Navigate | Safe R | October 14, 2026 |

== Summary of results ==
Italics denote an open seat held by the incumbent party; bold text denotes a gain for a party.

| State House District | Incumbent | Party | Elected Representative | Outcome |
|---|---|---|---|---|
| 1 | Jeremy Wooldridge | Rep | Mark Nichols | Rep Hold |
| 2 | Trey Steimel | Rep | Trey Steimel | Rep Hold |
| 3 | Stetson Painter | Rep | Stetson Painter | Rep Hold |
| 4 | Jack Fortner | Rep | Jason Nazarenko | Rep Hold |
| 5 | Ron McNair | Rep | Mike Bishop | Rep Hold |
| 6 | Harlan Breaux | Rep | Cody Rogers | Rep Hold |
| 7 | Brit McKenzie | Rep | Brit McKenzie | Rep Hold |
| 8 | Kara Armas* | Rep | Brian Armas | Rep Hold |
| 9 | Diana Gonzales Worthen | Dem | Diana Gonzales Worthen | Dem Hold |
| 10 | Mindy McAlindon | Rep | **Jacob Allen** | **Dem Gain** |
| 11 | Rebecca Burkes | Rep | **Rey Hernandez** | **Dem Gain** |
| 12 | Hope Hendren Duke | Rep | Hope Hendren Duke | Rep Hold |
| 13 | R. Scott Richardson | Rep | **Mitchell Smith** | **Dem Gain** |
| 14 | Nick Burkes | Rep | Nick Burkes | Rep Hold |
| 15 | John P. Carr | Rep | **Daniel Holtmeyer** | **Dem Gain** |
| 16 | Kendon Underwood | Rep | Kendon Underwood | Rep Hold |
| 17 | Randy Torres | Rep | Randy Torres | Rep Hold |
| 18 | Robin Lundstrum | Rep | Robin Lundstrum | Rep Hold |
| 19 | Steve Unger | Rep | **Jamie Atkinson** | **Dem Gain** |
| 20 | Denise Garner | Dem | Max Deitchler | Dem Hold |
| 21 | Nicole Clowney | Dem | Nicole Clowney | Dem Hold |
| 22 | David Whitaker | Dem | David Whitaker | Dem Hold |
| 23 | Kendra Moore | Rep | Kendra Moore | Rep Hold |
| 24 | Brad Hall | Rep | Charlene Fite | Rep Hold |
| 25 | Chad Puryear | Rep | Chad Puryear | Rep Hold |
| 26 | James Eaton | Rep | James Eaton | Rep Hold |
| 27 | Steven Walker | Rep | Steven Walker | Rep Hold |
| 28 | Bart Schulz | Rep | Bart Schulz | Rep Hold |
| 29 | Rick McClure | Rep | Rick McClure | Rep Hold |
| 30 | Frances "Fran" Cavenaugh | Rep | Josh Longmire | Rep Hold |
| 31 | Jimmy Gazaway | Rep | Jimmy Gazaway | Rep Hold |
| 32 | Jack Ladyman | Rep | **Erika Askeland** | **Dem Gain** |
| 33 | Jon Milligan | Rep | Jon Milligan | Rep Hold |
| 34 | Joey L. Carr | Rep | Joey L. Carr | Rep Hold |
| 35 | Jessie McGruder | Dem | Audrey Willis | Dem Hold |
| 36 | Johnny Rye | Rep | Johnny Rye | Rep Hold |
| 37 | Steve Hollowell | Rep | Steve Hollowell | Rep Hold |
| 38 | Dwight Tosh | Rep | Dwight Tosh | Rep Hold |
| 39 | Wayne Long | Rep | Wayne Long | Rep Hold |
| 40 | Shad Pearce | Rep | Shad Pearce | Rep Hold |
| 41 | Alyssa Brown | Rep | Alyssa Brown | Rep Hold |
| 42 | Stephen Meeks | Rep | Jeremy Riddle | Rep Hold |
| 43 | Rick Beck | Rep | Rick Beck | Rep Hold |
| 44 | Bill Teeter | Rep | Bill Teeter | Rep Hold |
| 45 | Aaron Pilkington | Rep | Aaron Pilkington | Rep Hold |
| 46 | Jon S. Eubanks | Rep | Tonya Fletcher | Rep Hold |
| 47 | Lee Johnson | Rep | Lee Johnson | Rep Hold |
| 48 | Ryan Rose | Rep | Ryan Rose | Rep Hold |
| 49 | Jay Richardson | Dem | Jay Richardson | Dem Hold |
| 50 | Zachary Gramlich | Rep | Zachary Gramlich | Rep Hold |
| 51 | Cindy Crawford | Rep | Cindy Crawford | Rep Hold |
| 52 | Marcus Richmond | Rep | Brent Montgomery | Rep Hold |
| 53 | Matt Duffield | Rep | Matt Duffield | Rep Hold |
| 54 | Mary Bentley | Rep | Mary Bentley | Rep Hold |
| 55 | Matthew Brown | Rep | **Cynthia Nations** | **Dem Gain** |
| 56 | Steve Magie | Dem | Steve Magie | Dem Hold |
| 57 | Cameron Cooper | Rep | Cameron Cooper | Rep Hold |
| 58 | Les Eaves | Rep | Les Eaves | Rep Hold |
| 59 | Jim Wooten | Rep | Jim Wooten | Rep Hold |
| 60 | Roger Lynch | Rep | Roger Lynch | Rep Hold |
| 61 | Jeremiah Moore | Rep | Jeremiah Moore | Rep Hold |
| 62 | Mark McElroy | Rep | **Dexter Miller** | **Dem Gain** |
| 63 | Lincoln Barnett | Dem | Lincoln Barnett | Dem Hold |
| 64 | Ken Ferguson | Dem | Ken Ferguson | Dem Hold |
| 65 | Glenn Barnes | Dem | Glenn Barnes | Dem Hold |
| 66 | Mark Perry | Dem | Mark Perry | Dem Hold |
| 67 | Karilyn Brown | Rep | **Cade Eberly** | **Dem Gain** |
| 68 | Brian S. Evans | Rep | Brian S. Evans | Rep Hold |
| 69 | David Ray | Rep | David Ray | Rep Hold |
| 70 | Alex Holladay | Dem | Alex Holladay | Dem Hold |
| 71 | Brandon Achor | Rep | **Cassandra Mayes** | **Dem Gain** |
| 72 | Tracy Steele | Dem | Talesha Dokes | Dem Hold |
| 73 | Andrew Collins | Dem | Andrew Collins | Dem Hold |
| 74 | Tippi McCullough | Dem | Tippi McCullough | Dem Hold |
| 75 | Ashley Hudson | Dem | Ashley Hudson | Dem Hold |
| 76 | Joy C. Springer | Dem | Joy C. Springer | Dem Hold |
| 77 | Fred Allen | Dem | Steven Person | Dem Hold |
| 78 | Keith Brooks | Rep | Keith Brooks | Rep Hold |
| 79 | Tara Shephard | Dem | Michael Mason | Dem Hold |
| 80 | Denise Ennett | Dem | Denise Ennett | Dem Hold |
| 81 | R. J. Hawk | Rep | R. J. Hawk | Rep Hold |
| 82 | Tony Furman | Rep | Tony Furman | Rep Hold |
| 83 | Paul Childress | Rep | Paul Childress | Rep Hold |
| 84 | Les Warren | Rep | Les Warren | Rep Hold |
| 85 | Richard McGrew | Rep | Richard McGrew | Rep Hold |
| 86 | John Maddox | Rep | John Maddox | Rep Hold |
| 87 | DeAnn Vaught | Rep | DeAnn Vaught | Rep Hold |
| 88 | Dolly Henley | Rep | Dolly Henley | Rep Hold |
| 89 | Justin Gonzales | Rep | Justin Gonzales | Rep Hold |
| 90 | Richard Womack | Rep | Richard Womack | Rep Hold |
| 91 | Bruce Cozart | Rep | Bruce Cozart | Rep Hold |
| 92 | Julie Mayberry | Rep | Dawn Creekmore | Rep Hold |
| 93 | Mike Holcomb | Rep | Mike Holcomb | Rep Hold |
| 94 | Jeff Wardlaw | Rep | John Kyle Day | Rep Hold |
| 95 | Howard Beaty | Rep | Howard Beaty | Rep Hold |
| 96 | Sonia Eubanks Barker | Rep | Sonia Eubanks Barker | Rep Hold |
| 97 | Matthew Shepherd | Rep | Jim Andrews | Rep Hold |
| 98 | Wade Andrews | Rep | Wade Andrews | Rep Hold |
| 99 | Lane Jean | Rep | Beth Baker | Rep Hold |
| 100 | Carol Dalby | Rep | Carol Dalby | Rep Hold |

- Kara Armas ran in the special election for the seat vacated by Austin McCollum to finish out the term expiring January 13, 2027.

== Overview ==
2026 Arkansas House of Representatives election results and statistics
| Party | Candidates | | Seats won | Aggregate votes | | 2024 general | | Change | |
| Party | Prim. | Gen. | Seats won | No. | Percent | Seats won | Vote % | Seats | Vote % |
|---|---|---|---|---|---|---|---|---|---|
| Republican | 112 | 86 | 70 | 556,269 | 70.15% | 81 | 70.74% | -11 | -0.59 |
| Democratic | 54 | 46 | 30 | 220,995 | 27.85% | 19 | 27.85% | +11 | +0.02 |
| Libertarian | (Note: Candidates nominated by convention) | 4 | 0 | 7,231 | 1.98% | 0 | 1.41% | 0 | +0.57 |
| Totals | 166 | 136 | 100 | 784,495 | 100% | 100 | — | 100 | — |
| Turnout | | | | | 42.27% | — | 65.10% | -22.83% | 42.27% |
| Registered voters | | | | | 1,856,044 | | | | |

=== By district ===
| District | 2020 Pres. | Incumbent | | | | Candidates |
| District | 2020 Pres. | Member | Party | First elected | Status | Candidates |
|---|---|---|---|---|---|---|
| 1 | R+64.1 | Jeremy Wooldridge | Republican | 2022 | Incumbent retired to run for state senate. Republican hold. | ▌ ✓ Mark A. Nichols (Republican); Republican primary: List: ▌ ✓ Mark A. Nichols: 2,592 votes, 53.20%; ▌Brian Carter: 2,280 votes, 46.80% |
| 2 | R+64.1 | Trey Steimel | Republican | 2022 | Incumbent re-elected. | ▌ ✓ Rep. Trey Steimel (Republican) |
| 3 | R+53.2 | Stetson Painter | Republican | 2022 | Incumbent re-elected. | ▌ ✓ Rep. Stetson Painter (Republican); ▌Carrie Huddleston (Democratic) |
| 4 | R+56.5 | Jason Nazarenko | Republican | 2024 | Incumbent re-elected. | ▌ ✓ Rep. Jason Nazarenko (Republican) |
| 5 | R+60.4 | Ron McNair | Republican | 2014 | Incumbent retiring. Republican hold. | ▌ ✓ Mike Bishop (Republican); Republican runoff: List: ▌ ✓ Mike Bishop: 1,857 votes, 59.14%; ▌Jeff Pratt: 1,283 votes, 40.86%; Republican primary: ▌ Mike Bishop: 1,563 votes, 32.29%; ▌ Jeff Pratt 1,477 votes, 30.52%; ▌Jon Burnside: 915 votes, 18.90%; ▌Kyle Evatt: 629 votes, 13.00%; ▌Truman Copeland: 256 votes, 5.29% |
| 6 | R+34.4 | Harlan Breaux | Republican | 2018 | Incumbent retired. Republican hold. | ▌ ✓ Cody Rogers (Republican); Republican runoff: List: ▌ ✓ Cody Rogers: 1,225 votes, 50.75%; ▌Hunter Rivett: 1,189 votes, 49.25%; Republican primary: ▌ Hunter Rivett: 2,137 votes, 47.68%; ▌ Cody Rogers 1,836 votes, 40.96%; ▌Steven L. Baird: 509 votes, 11.36% |
| 7 | R+25.2 | Brit McKenzie | Republican | 2022 | Incumbent re-elected. | ▌ ✓ Rep. Brit McKenzie (Republican) |
| 8 | R+33.8 | Austin McCollum | Republican | 2016 | Incumbent resigned. Republican hold. | ▌ ✓ Brian Armas (Republican) |
| 9 | D+3.1 | Diana Gonzales Worthen | Democratic | 2024 | Incumbent re-elected. | ▌ ✓ Rep. Diana Gonzales Worthen (Democratic); ▌Matt Goff (Republican) |
| 10 | R+12.1 | Mindy McAlindon | Republican | 2022 | Incumbent lost re-election. Democratic gain. | ▌ ✓ Jacob Allen (Democratic); ▌Rep. Mindy McAlindon (Republican) |
| 11 | R+16.2 | Rebecca Burkes | Republican | 2022 | Incumbent lost re-election. Democratic gain. | ▌ ✓ Rey Hernandez (Democratic); ▌Rep. Rebecca Burkes (Republican) |
| 12 | R+40.3 | Hope Hendren Duke | Republican | 2022 | Incumbent re-elected. | ▌ ✓ Rep. Hope Hendren Duke (Republican) |
| 13 | R+10.4 | Scott Richardson | Republican | 2022 | Incumbent lost re-election. Democratic gain. | ▌ ✓ Mitchell Smith (Democratic); ▌Rep. Scott Richardson (Republican) |
| 14 | R+23.5 | Nick Burkes | Republican | 2024 | Incumbent re-elected. | ▌ ✓ Rep. Nick Burkes (Republican); ▌Timothy J. Heron Jr. (Democratic) |
| 15 | R+9.9 | John P. Carr | Republican | 2020 | Incumbent lost re-election. Democratic gain. | ▌ ✓ Daniel Holtmeyer (Democratic); ▌Rep. John P. Carr (Republican) |
| 16 | R+29.2 | Kendon Underwood | Republican | 2020 | Incumbent re-elected. | ▌ ✓ Rep. Kendon Underwood (Republican); ▌Letisha Hinds (Democratic) |
| 17 | R+49.6 | Randy Torres | Republican | 2024 | Incumbent re-elected. | ▌ ✓ Rep. Randy Torres (Republican) |
| 18 | R+19.5 | Robin Lundstrum | Republican | 2014 | Incumbent re-elected. | ▌ ✓ Rep. Robin Lundstrum (Republican) |
| 19 | R+7.0 | Steve Unger | Republican | 2022 | Incumbent lost re-election. Democratic gain. | ▌ ✓ Jamie Atkinson (Democratic); ▌Rep. Steve Unger (Republican) |
| 20 | D+20.7 | Denise Garner | Democratic | 2018 | Incumbent retiring to stand for state senate. Democratic hold. | ▌ ✓ Max Deitchler (Democratic) |
| 21 | D+48.1 | Nicole Clowney | Democratic | 2018 | Incumbent re-elected. | ▌ ✓ Rep. Nicole Clowney (Democratic) |
| 22 | D+3.6 | David Whitaker | Democratic | 2012 | Incumbent re-elected. | ▌ ✓ Rep. David Whitaker (Democratic) |
| 23 | R+33.7 | Kendra Moore | Republican | 2022 | Incumbent re-elected. | ▌ ✓ Rep. Kendra Moore (Republican) |
| 24 | R+60.7 | Brad Hall | Republican | 2024 | Incumbent initially sought re-election, but withdrew. Republican hold. | ▌ ✓ Charlene Fite (Republican); ▌Ryan Intchauspe (Democratic); Republican primary: ▌ ✓ Charlene Fite: 2,506 votes, 70.22%; ▌Melissa W. Koller: 1,063 votes, 29.78% |
| 25 | R+40.4 | Chad Puryear | Republican | 2022 | Incumbent re-elected. | ▌ ✓ Rep. Chad Puryear (Republican); ▌Courtney King (Democratic) |
| 26 | R+57.4 | James Eaton | Republican | 2024 | Incumbent re-elected. | ▌ ✓ Rep. James Eaton (Republican) |
| 27 | R+64.0 | Steven Walker | Republican | 2022 | Incumbent re-elected. | ▌ ✓ Rep. Steven Walker (Republican) |
| 28 | R+65.9 | Bart Schulz | Republican | 2022 | Incumbent re-elected. | ▌ ✓ Rep. Bart Schulz (Republican) |
| 29 | R+47.6 | Rick McClure | Republican | 2020 | Incumbent re-elected. | ▌ ✓ Rep. Rick McClure (Republican); ▌Deonna Morgan (Democratic) |
| 30 | R+54.2 | Frances Cavenaugh | Republican | 2016 | Incumbent retired. Republican hold. | ▌ ✓ Josh Longmire (Republican); Republican primary: List: ▌ ✓ Josh Longmire: 2,162 votes, 68.40%; ▌Coty Powers: 999 votes, 31.60% |
| 31 | R+54.4 | Jimmy Gazaway | Republican | 2016 | Incumbent re-elected. | ▌ ✓ Rep. Jimmy Gazaway (Republican) |
| 32 | R+19.3 | Jack Ladyman | Republican | 2014 | Incumbent lost re-election. Democratic gain. | ▌ ✓ Erika Askeland (Democratic); ▌Rep. Jack Ladyman (Republican); Democratic primary: ▌ ✓ Erika Askeland: 977 votes, 93.40%; ▌Joshua Alfano: 69 votes, 6.60% |
| 33 | R+56.8 | Jon Milligan | Republican | 2020 | Incumbent re-elected. | ▌ ✓ Rep. Jon Milligan (Republican) |
| 34 | R+4.3 | Joey L. Carr | Republican | 2022 | Incumbent re-elected. | ▌ ✓ Rep. Joey L. Carr (Republican); ▌Michael Middlebrook (Democratic) |
| 35 | D+8.9 | Jessie McGruder | Democratic | 2024 | Incumbent retired to run for state senate. Democratic hold. | ▌ ✓ Audrey P. Willis (Democratic); ▌Robert Thorne Jr. (Republican); Democratic runoff: List: ▌ ✓ Audrey P. Willis: 344 votes, 60.88%; ▌Joyce Ann Gray: 221 votes, 39.12%; Democratic primary: ▌ Joyce Ann Gray: 408 votes, 24.07%; ▌ Audrey P. Willis: 407 votes, 24.01%; ▌Demetris Johnson Jr.: 370 votes, 21.83%; ▌Sherry Holliman: 267 votes, 15.75%; ▌Willie Williams: 243 votes, 14.34% |
| 36 | R+34.1 | Johnny Rye | Republican | 2016 | Incumbent re-elected. | ▌ ✓ Rep. Johnny Rye (Republican); ▌Shamal C. Carter (Democratic) |
| 37 | R+37.6 | Steve Hollowell | Republican | 2016 | Incumbent re-elected. | ▌ ✓ Rep. Steve Hollowell (Republican) |
| 38 | R+45.3 | Dwight Tosh | Republican | 2014 | Incumbent re-elected. | ▌ ✓ Rep. Dwight Tosh (Republican) |
| 39 | R+58.2 | Wayne Long | Republican | 2022 | Incumbent re-elected. | ▌ ✓ Rep. Wayne Long (Republican); Republican primary: List: ▌ ✓ Rep. Wayne Long: 1,895 votes, 52.73%; ▌Cody Smith: 1,699 votes, 47.27% |
| 40 | R+57.9 | Shad Pearce | Republican | 2022 | Incumbent re-elected. | ▌ ✓ Rep. Shad Pearce (Republican) |
| 41 | R+63.0 | Alyssa Brown | Republican | 2024 | Incumbent re-elected. | ▌ ✓ Rep. Alyssa Brown (Republican) |
| 42 | R+61.0 | Stephen Meeks | Republican | 2010 | Incumbent term-limited. Republican hold. | ▌ ✓ Jeremy Riddle (Republican); Republican primary: List: ▌ ✓ Jeremy Riddle: 3,296 votes, 67.72%; ▌Scout Stubbs: 1,571 votes, 32.28% |
| 43 | R+42.8 | Rick Beck | Republican | 2014 | Incumbent re-elected. | ▌ ✓ Rep. Rick Beck (Republican) |
| 44 | R+62.9 | Bill Teeter | Republican | 2026 (special) | Incumbent re-elected. | ▌ ✓ Rep. Bill Teeter (Republican) |
| 45 | R+51.3 | Aaron Pilkington | Republican | 2016 | Incumbent re-elected. | ▌ ✓ Rep. Aaron Pilkington (Republican) |
| 46 | R+60.6 | Jon S. Eubanks | Republican | 2010 | Incumbent term-limited. Republican hold. | ▌ ✓ Tonya Fletcher (Republican); Republican runoff: List: ▌ ✓ Tonya Fletcher: 1,435 votes, 55%; ▌Curtis J. Varnell: 1,174 votes, 45%; Republican primary: ▌ Tonya Fletcher: 1,500 votes, 31.51%; ▌ Curtis J. Varnell: 1,499 votes, 31.48%; ▌Brian Cooper: 1,164 votes, 24.45%; ▌Ronni Tate Young: 598 votes, 12.56% |
| 47 | R+65.0 | Lee Johnson | Republican | 2018 | Incumbent re-elected. | ▌ ✓ Rep. Lee Johnson (Republican) |
| 48 | R+44.7 | Ryan Rose | Republican | 2022 | Incumbent re-elected. | ▌ ✓ Rep. Ryan Rose (Republican); ▌Hunter Jackson (Libertarian) |
| 49 | D+14.2 | Jay Richardson | Democratic | 2018 | Incumbent re-elected. | ▌ ✓ Rep. Jay Richardson (Democratic) |
| 50 | R+20.6 | Zachary Gramlich | Republican | 2022 | Incumbent re-elected. | ▌ ✓ Rep. Zachary Gramlich (Republican); ▌Wendy Peer (Democratic) |
| 51 | R+34.8 | Cindy Crawford | Republican | 2018 | Incumbent re-elected. | ▌ ✓ Rep. Cindy Crawford (Republican); ▌Jane-Ellen Udouj-Kutchka (Democratic) |
| 52 | R+63.6 | Marcus Richmond | Republican | 2014 | Incumbent retired. Republican hold. | ▌ ✓ Brent Montgomery (Republican); Republican runoff: List: ▌ ✓ Brent Montgomery: 1,290 votes, 50.41%; ▌Kristain Thompson: 1,269 votes, 49.59%; Republican primary: ▌ Brent Montgomery: 1,876 votes, 43.03%; ▌ Kristain Thompson: 1,208 votes, 27.71%; ▌Mike Jones: 915 votes, 20.99%; ▌Crystal Malloy: 361 votes, 8.28% |
| 53 | R+31.5 | Matt Duffield | Republican | 2022 | Incumbent re-elected. | ▌ ✓ Rep. Matt Duffield (Republican); ▌Jennifer Lewter (Democratic); Republican primary: ▌ ✓ Rep. Matt Duffield: 1,456 votes, 55.19%; ▌David J. Howell: 1,182 votes, 44.81% |
| 54 | R+37.8 | Mary Bentley | Republican | 2014 | Incumbent re-elected. | ▌ ✓ Rep. Mary Bentley (Republican); ▌Doug Corbitt (Democratic) |
| 55 | R+7.9 | Matthew Brown | Republican | 2022 | Incumbent lost re-election. Democratic gain. | ▌ ✓ Cynthia Nations (Democratic); ▌Rep. Matthew Brown (Republican) |
| 56 | R+3.1 | Steve Magie | Democratic | 2012 | Incumbent re-elected. | ▌ ✓ Rep. Steve Magie (Democratic); ▌Mark Brannan (Republican) |
| 57 | R+65.1 | Cameron Cooper | Republican | 2022 | Incumbent re-elected. | ▌ ✓ Rep. Cameron Cooper (Republican); Republican primary: List: ▌ ✓ Rep. Cameron Cooper: 2,342 votes, 63.08%; ▌Andy Pennington: 1,371 votes, 36.92% |
| 58 | R+49.4 | Les Eaves | Republican | 2014 | Incumbent re-elected. | ▌ ✓ Rep. Les Eaves (Republican); ▌Jocelyn Fry (Libertarian) |
| 59 | R+59.5 | Jim Wooten | Republican | 2018 (special) | Incumbent re-elected. | ▌ ✓ Rep. Jim Wooten (Republican); Republican primary: List: ▌ ✓ Rep. Jim Wooten: 1,865 votes, 53.81%; ▌Tony Ferguson II: 1,601 votes, 46.19% |
| 60 | R+48.0 | Roger Lynch | Republican | 2016 | Incumbent re-elected. | ▌ ✓ Rep. Roger Lynch (Republican); ▌Beverly Coleman-Keown (Democratic) |
| 61 | R+33.9 | Jeremiah Moore | Republican | 2022 | Incumbent re-elected. | ▌ ✓ Rep. Jeremiah Moore (Republican); ▌Garrett Sheeks (Libertarian) |
| 62 | D+6.7 | Mark McElroy | Republican | 2012 | Incumbent lost re-election. Democratic gain. | ▌ ✓ Dexter R. Miller (Democratic); ▌Rep. Mark McElroy (Republican) |
| 63 | D+13.3 | Lincoln Barnett | Democratic | 2024 | Incumbent re-elected. | ▌ ✓ Rep. Lincoln Barnett (Democratic) |
| 64 | D+50.0 | Ken Ferguson | Democratic | 2014 | Incumbent re-elected. | ▌ ✓ Rep. Ken Ferguson (Democratic) |
| 65 | D+49.0 | Glenn Barnes | Democratic | 2024 | Incumbent re-elected. | ▌ ✓ Rep. Glenn Barnes (Democratic) |
| 66 | D+34.2 | Mark Perry | Democratic | 2008 | Incumbent re-elected. | ▌ ✓ Rep. Mark Perry (Democratic) |
| 67 | R+2.6 | Karilyn Brown | Republican | 2014 | Incumbent lost re-election. Democratic gain. | ▌ ✓ Andrew Cade Eberly (Democratic); ▌Rep. Karilyn Brown (Republican) |
| 68 | R+54.7 | Brian S. Evans | Republican | 2018 | Incumbent re-elected. | ▌ ✓ Rep. Brian S. Evans (Republican) |
| 69 | R+33.8 | David Ray | Republican | 2020 | Incumbent re-elected. | ▌ ✓ Rep. David Ray (Republican); ▌Dean Hunter (Democratic) |
| 70 | R+4.1 | Alex Holladay | Democratic | 2026 (special) | Incumbent elected to full term. | ▌ ✓ Rep. Alex Holladay (Democratic); ▌Bo Renshaw (Republican); Democratic primary: ▌ ✓ Alex Holladay: 3,111 votes, 82.26%; ▌Cordelia Smith-Johnson: 671 votes, 17.74% |
| 71 | R+3.5 | Brandon Achor | Republican | 2022 | Incumbent retired to run for state senate Democratic gain. | ▌ ✓ Cassandra Mayes (Democratic); ▌Stephen Bright (Republican) |
| 72 | D+44.5 | Tracy Steele | Democratic | 2024 | Incumbent term-limited. Democratic hold. | ▌ ✓ Talesha Dokes (Democratic); Democratic primary: List: ▌ ✓ Talesha Dokes: 1,439 votes, 64.44%; ▌Angela Person-West: 794 votes, 35.56% |
| 73 | D+16.6 | Andrew Collins | Democratic | 2018 | Incumbent re-elected. | ▌ ✓ Rep. Andrew Collins (Democratic) |
| 74 | D+44.6 | Tippi McCullough | Democratic | 2018 | Incumbent re-elected. | ▌ ✓ Rep. Tippi McCullough (Democratic) |
| 75 | D+9.0 | Ashley Hudson | Democratic | 2020 | Incumbent re-elected. | ▌ ✓ Rep. Ashley Hudson (Democratic); ▌Hunter Sadler (Republican) |
| 76 | D+74.8 | Joy C. Springer | Democratic | 2020 (special) | Incumbent re-elected. | ▌ ✓ Rep. Joy C. Springer (Democratic); ▌Isbac Ceja (Republican) |
| 77 | D+58.0 | Fred Allen | Democratic | 2008 | Incumbent term-limited. Democratic hold. | ▌ ✓ Steven Person (Democratic) |
| 78 | R+31.8 | Keith Brooks | Republican | 2020 | Incumbent re-elected. | ▌ ✓ Rep. Keith Brooks (Republican) |
| 79 | D+64.6 | Tara Shephard | Democratic | 2022 | Incumbent retired to run for state senate. Democratic hold. | ▌ ✓ Michael Mason (Democratic) |
| 80 | D+53.1 | Denise Ennett | Democratic | 2019 (special) | Incumbent re-elected. | ▌ ✓ Rep. Denise Jones (Democratic); ▌Daniel Stuckey (Libertarian) |
| 81 | R+22.4 | R. J. Hawk | Republican | 2022 | Incumbent re-elected. | ▌ ✓ Rep. R. J. Hawk (Republican); ▌Gina Thomas-Littlejohn (Democratic); Democratic primary: ▌ ✓ Gina Thomas-Littlejohn: 920 votes, 63.67%; ▌Elijah Zane Thompson: 525 votes, 36.33% |
| 82 | R+32.8 | Tony Furman | Republican | 2020 | Incumbent re-elected. | ▌ ✓ Rep. Tony Furman (Republican); Republican primary: List: ▌ ✓ Rep. Tony Furman: 1,583 votes, 66.23%; ▌Steve Brown: 807 votes, 33.77% |
| 83 | R+47.1 | Paul Childress | Republican | 2024 | Incumbent re-elected. | ▌ ✓ Rep. Paul Childress (Republican) |
| 84 | R+23.8 | Les Warren | Republican | 2016 | Incumbent re-elected. | ▌ ✓ Rep. Les Warren (Republican) |
| 85 | R+45.5 | Richard McGrew | Republican | 2019 (special) | Incumbent re-elected. | ▌ ✓ Rep. Richard McGrew (Republican) |
| 86 | R+66.3 | John Maddox | Republican | 2016 | Incumbent re-elected. | ▌ ✓ Rep. John Maddox (Republican) |
| 87 | R+51.9 | DeAnn Vaught | Republican | 2014 | Incumbent re-elected. | ▌ ✓ Rep. DeAnn Vaught (Republican) |
| 88 | R+32.0 | Dolly Henley | Republican | 2024 | Incumbent re-elected. | ▌ ✓ Rep. Dolly Henley (Republican); Republican primary: List: ▌ ✓ Rep. Dolly Henley: 2,244 votes, 71.33%; ▌Lonny Mack Goodwin: 902 votes, 28.67% |
| 89 | R+47.8 | Justin Gonzales | Republican | 2014 | Incumbent re-elected. | ▌ ✓ Rep. Justin Gonzales (Republican) |
| 90 | R+32.2 | Richard Womack | Republican | 2012 | Incumbent re-elected. | ▌ ✓ Rep. Richard Womack (Republican) |
| 91 | R+25.3 | Bruce Cozart | Republican | 2011 (special) | Incumbent re-elected. | ▌ ✓ Rep. Bruce Cozart (Republican) |
| 92 | R+64.3 | Julie Mayberry | Republican | 2014 | Incumbent retired. Republican hold. | ▌ ✓ Dawn Creekmore (Republican); Republican runoff: List: ▌ ✓ Dawn Creekmore: 2,605 votes, 54.73%; ▌Eric Shepherd: 2,155 votes, 45.27%; Republican primary: ▌ Dawn Creekmore: 2,605 votes, 49.76%; ▌ Eric Shepherd: 2,155 votes, 41.17%; ▌Casey Reed: 475 votes, 9.07% |
| 93 | R+55.9 | Mike Holcomb | Republican | 2012 | Incumbent re-elected. | ▌ ✓ Rep. Mike Holcomb (Republican) |
| 94 | R+21.0 | Jeff Wardlaw | Republican | 2010 | Incumbent term-limited. Republican hold. | ▌ ✓ John Kyle Day (Republican); Republican primary: List: ▌ ✓ John Kyle Day: 1,221 votes, 51.85%; ▌Missy Wardlaw: 1,134 votes, 48.15% |
| 95 | R+24.2 | Howard Beaty | Republican | 2020 | Incumbent re-elected. | ▌ ✓ Rep. Howard Beaty (Republican) |
| 96 | R+42.0 | Sonia Eubanks Barker | Republican | 2016 | Incumbent re-elected. | ▌ ✓ Rep. Sonia Eubanks Barker (Republican) |
| 97 | R+25.4 | Matthew Shepherd | Republican | 2010 | Incumbent term-limited. Republican hold. | ▌ ✓ Jim Andrews (Republican) |
| 98 | R+9.4 | Wade Andrews | Republican | 2022 | Incumbent re-elected. | ▌ ✓ Rep. Wade Andrews (Republican) |
| 99 | R+60.0 | Lane Jean | Republican | 2010 | Incumbent term-limited. Republican hold. | ▌ ✓ Beth Baker (Republican) |
| 100 | R+30.4 | Carol Dalby | Republican | 2016 | Incumbent re-elected. | ▌ ✓ Rep. Carol Dalby (Republican); ▌Calvin Thomason (Democratic) |

== Results ==
District 1 • District 2 • District 3 • District 4 • District 5 • District 6 • District 7 • District 8 • District 9 • District 10 • District 11 • District 12 • District 13 • District 14 • District 15 • District 16 • District 17 • District 18 • District 19 • District 20 • District 21 • District 22 • District 23 • District 24 • District 25 • District 26 • District 27 • District 28 • District 29 • District 30 • District 31 • District 32 • District 33 • District 34 • District 35 • District 36 • District 37 • District 38 • District 39 • District 40 • District 41 • District 42 • District 43 • District 44 • District 45 • District 46 • District 47 • District 48 • District 49 • District 50 • District 51 • District 52 • District 53 • District 54 • District 55 • District 56 • District 57 • District 58 • District 59 • District 60 • District 61 • District 62 • District 63 • District 64 • District 65 • District 66 • District 67 • District 68 • District 69 • District 70 • District 71 • District 72 • District 73 • District 74 • District 75 • District 76 • District 77 • District 78 • District 79 • District 80 • District 81 • District 82 • District 83 • District 84 • District 85 • District 86 • District 87 • District 88 • District 89 • District 90 • District 91 • District 92 • District 93 • District 94 • District 95 • District 96 • District 97 • District 98 • District 99 • District 100

=== District 1 ===
District 1 election, Republican primary
| Candidate | Mark A. Nichols | Brian Carter |
| Party | Republican | Republican |
| Popular vote | 2,589 | 2,280 |
| Percentage | 53.17% | 46.83% |
- County results Nichols: 50–60% 60–70% Carter: 50–60%
Representative before election
Jeremy Wooldridge
Republican
Elected Representative
TBD

Incumbent Republican Jeremy Wooldridge is not running for re-election.

1st district Republican primary Unofficial results
| Party | Candidate | Votes | % |
|---|---|---|---|
| Republican | Mark A. Nichols | 2,589 | 53.17% |
| Republican | Brian Carter | 2,280 | 46.83% |
| Total votes | | 4,869 | 100.00% |

=== District 5 ===
Incumbent Republican Ron McNair is not running for re-eleciton

District 5 election, Republican runoff
| Candidate | Mike Bishop | Jeff Pratt |
| Party | Republican | Republican |
| Popular vote | 1,857 | 1,283 |
| Percentage | 59.14% | 40.86% |
Representative before election
Ron McNair
Republican
Elected Representative
TBD

5th district Republican primary Unofficial results
| Party | Candidate | Votes | % |
|---|---|---|---|
| Republican | Mike Bishop | 1,563 | 32.30% |
| Republican | Jeff Pratt | 1,477 | 30.52% |
| Republican | Jon Edward Burnside | 915 | 18.91% |
| Republican | Kyle Evatt | 629 | 13.00% |
| Republican | Truman Copeland | 255 | 5.27% |
| Total votes | | 4,839 | 100.00% |

5th district Republican primary runoff
| Party | Candidate | Votes | % |
|---|---|---|---|
| Republican | Mike Bishop | 1,857 | 59.14% |
| Republican | Jeff Pratt | 1,283 | 40.86% |
| Total votes | | 3,140 | 100.00% |

=== District 6 ===
Incumbent Republican Harland Breaux is not running for re-election

District 6 election, Republican runoff
| Candidate | Cody Rogers | Hunter Rivett |
| Party | Republican | Republican |
| Popular vote | 1,225 | 1,189 |
| Percentage | 50.75% | 49.25% |
Representative before election
Harlan Breaux
Republican
Elected Representative
TBD

Results by county Rivett: 50–60% Rogers: 70–80%

6th district Republican primary Unofficial results
| Party | Candidate | Votes | % |
|---|---|---|---|
| Republican | Hunter Rivett | 2,133 | 47.66% |
| Republican | Cody Rogers | 1,835 | 41.01% |
| Republican | Steven L. Baird | 507 | 11.33% |
| Total votes | | 4,475 | 100.00% |

6th district Republican primary runoff
| Party | Candidate | Votes | % |
|---|---|---|---|
| Republican | Cody Rogers | 1,225 | 50.75% |
| Republican | Hunter Rivett | 1,189 | 49.25% |
| Total votes | | 3,414 | 100.00% |

=== District 24 ===
Incumbent Republican Brad Hall is not running for re-election

District 24 election
| Candidate | Charlene Fite | Ryan Intchauspe |
| Party | Republican | Democratic |
Incumbent Representative
Brad Hall
Republican

Results by county Fite: 60–70%; 70–80%

24th district Republican primary Unofficial results
| Party | Candidate | Votes | % |
|---|---|---|---|
| Republican | Charlene Fite | 2,504 | 70.24% |
| Republican | Melissa W. Koller | 1,061 | 29.76% |
| Total votes | | 3,565 | 100.00% |
