= 2022 Arkansas House of Representatives election =

- November 8, 2022

All 100 seats in the Arkansas House of Representatives 51 seats needed for a majority
	Majority party	Minority party
Leader	Matthew Shepherd	Tippi McCullough
Party	Republican	Democratic
Leader since	June 15, 2018	January 11, 2021
Leader's seat	97th	74th
Last election	78	22
Seats won	82	18
Seat change	▲4	▼4
Popular vote	590,016	193,673
Percentage	71.57%	23.49%
Swing	▲1.48%	▼4.95%
- Republican gain Republican hold Democratic hold 40–50% 50–60% 60–70% 70–80% 80–90% >90% 40–50% 50–60% 70–80% 80–90% >90%
Speaker before election
Matthew Shepherd
Republican
Elected Speaker
Matthew Shepherd
Republican

The 2022 Arkansas House of Representatives elections were held on November 8, 2022. Elections were held to elect representatives from all 100 House of Representatives districts across the U.S. state of Arkansas. They were held alongside numerous other federal, state, and local elections, including the 2022 Arkansas Senate election.

== Retirements ==
=== Democrats ===
1. District 29: Fredrick Love was term limited.
2. District 48: Reginald Murdock retired to run for state senate from District 9.
3. District 55: Monte Hodges retired to run for U. S. representative from Arkansas's 1st congressional district.
4. District 89: Megan Godfrey retired.

=== Republicans ===
1. District 15: Ken Bragg retired.
2. District 39: Mark Lowery retired to run for treasurer of Arkansas.
3. District 56: Joe Jett retired.
4. District 58: Brandt Smith retired to run for U. S. representative from Arkansas's 1st congressional district.
5. District 62: Michelle Gray retired.
6. District 63: Stu Smith retired.
7. District 64: John Payton retired to run for state senate from District 22.
8. District 70: Spencer Hawks retired to run for state senate from District 17.
9. District 71: Joe Cloud retired.
10. District 77: Justin Boyd retired to run for state senate from District 27.
11. District 79: Gary Deffenbaugh retired.
12. District 81: Bruce Coleman retired.
13. District 83: Keith Slape retired to run for state senate from District 28.
14. District 88: Clint Penzo retired to run for state senate from District 31.
15. District 92: Gayla Hendren McKenzie retired to run for state senate from District 35.
16. District 93: Jim Dotson retired to run for state senate from District 34.
17. District 96: Joshua P. Bryant retired to run for state senate from District 32.
18. District 100: Nelda Speaks retired.

== Incumbents defeated ==
=== Republicans ===
1. District 2: Marsh Davis lost renomination to Trey Steimel after being redistricted from District 61.
2. District 39: Craig Christiansen lost renomination to Wayne Long after being redistricted from District 47.
3. District 61: David Hillman lost renomination to Jeremiah Moore after being redistricted from District 13.

== Predictions ==
Source	Ranking	As of
Sabato's Crystal Ball	Safe R	May 19, 2022

== Results ==
=== Overall ===
Parties	Votes	%	Seats	±
Republican	590,016	71.57%	82	▲4
Democratic	193,673	23.49%	18	▼4
Libertarian	36,867	4.47%	0	Steady
Independent	3,820	0.46%	0	Steady

Summary of the November 8, 2022 Arkansas House of Representatives election results
Party	Candidates	Votes	%	Seats	+/–	%
Republican	87	590,016	71.57%	82	▲4	82%
Democratic	48	193,673	23.49%	18	▼4	18%
Libertarian	31	36,867	4.47%	0	Steady	0%
Independent	2	3,820	0.46%	0	Steady	0%
Total	168	824,376	100.00%	100	Steady	

Popular vote
Republican	71.57%
Democratic	23.49%
Libertarian	4.47%
Independent	0.46%

House seats won
Republican	82%
Democratic	18%

=== Closest races ===
Seats where the margin of victory was under 10%:

1. District 56, 0.12%
2. District 62, 2.54%
3. District 9, 3.81%
4. District 22, 5.02%
5. District 67, 5.02%
6. District 19, 7.7%
7. District 34, 8.2%
8. District 98, 8.88% (gain)
9. District 75, 9.7%

=== District 1 ===
2022 Arkansas House of Representatives election, 1st district
Party	Candidate	Votes	%
Republican	Jeremy Wooldridge	7,027	81.43
Democratic	Teresa L. Roofe	1,602	18.57
Total votes		8,629	100.00

=== District 2 ===
2022 Arkansas House of Representatives election, 2nd district
Party	Candidate	Votes	%
Republican	Trey Steimel	7,895	83.86
Libertarian	Teresa M. Norman	1,520	16.14
Total votes		9,415	100.00

=== District 3 ===
2022 Arkansas House of Representatives election, 3rd district
Party	Candidate	Votes	%
Republican	Stetson Painter	9,205	82.67
Libertarian	Steven Gene Parsons	1,929	17.33
Total votes		11,134	100.00

=== District 4 ===
2022 Arkansas House of Representatives election, 4th district
Party	Candidate	Votes	%
Republican	Jack Fortner	9,790	100.00
Total votes		9,790	100.00
Republican hold			

=== District 5 ===
2022 Arkansas House of Representatives election, 5th district
Party	Candidate	Votes	%
Republican	Ron McNair (incumbent)	8,388	82.36
Independent	Jim A. Hall	1,797	17.64
Total votes		10,185	100.00

=== District 6 ===
2022 Arkansas House of Representatives election, 6th district
Party	Candidate	Votes	%
Republican	Harlan Breaux	6,650	65.47
Democratic	Markeeta Tucker	2,901	28.56
Libertarian	Dakota Logan	607	5.98
Total votes		10,158	100.00

=== District 7 ===
2022 Arkansas House of Representatives election, 7th district
Party	Candidate	Votes	%
Republican	Brit McKenzie	6,325	100.00
Total votes		6,325	100.00
Republican hold			

=== District 8 ===
2022 Arkansas House of Representatives election, 8th district
Party	Candidate	Votes	%
Republican	Austin McCollum (incumbent)	8,469	100.00
Total votes		8,469	100.00
Republican hold			

=== District 9 ===
2022 Arkansas House of Representatives election, 9th district
Party	Candidate	Votes	%
Republican	DeAnna Hodges	1,431	50.00
Democratic	Diana Gonzales Worthen	1,322	46.19
Libertarian	Steven Stilling	109	3.81
Total votes		2,862	100.00

=== District 10 ===
2022 Arkansas House of Representatives election, 10th district
Party	Candidate	Votes	%
Republican	Mindy McAlindon	6,519	56.31
Democratic	Kate Schaffer	5,059	43.69
Total votes		11,578	100.00

=== District 11 ===
2022 Arkansas House of Representatives election, 11th district
Party	Candidate	Votes	%
Republican	Rebecca Burkes	3,497	61.01
Democratic	Rey Hernandez	2,235	38.99
Total votes		5,732	100.00

=== District 12 ===
2022 Arkansas House of Representatives election, 12th district
Party	Candidate	Votes	%
Republican	Hope Hendren Duke	9,851	76.60
Libertarian	D. Michael Gill	3,010	23.40
Total votes		12,861	100.00

=== District 13 ===
2022 Arkansas House of Representatives election, 13th district
Party	Candidate	Votes	%
Republican	Scott Richardson	4,158	55.63
Democratic	Jen Standerfer	3,317	44.37
Total votes		7,475	100.00

=== District 14 ===
2022 Arkansas House of Representatives election, 14th district
Party	Candidate	Votes	%
Republican	Grant Hodges	5,185	63.33
Democratic	Brian Eaton	3,002	36.67
Total votes		8,187	100.00

=== District 15 ===
2022 Arkansas House of Representatives election, 15th district
Party	Candidate	Votes	%
Republican	John P. Carr (incumbent)	4,224	58.83
Democratic	Rachel Cox	2,956	41.17
Total votes		7,180	100.00

=== District 16 ===
2022 Arkansas House of Representatives election, 16th district
Party	Candidate	Votes	%
Republican	Kendon Underwood (incumbent)	9,193	100.00
Total votes		9,193	100.00
Republican hold			

=== District 17 ===
2022 Arkansas House of Representatives election, 17th district
Party	Candidate	Votes	%
Republican	Delia Haak (incumbent)	7,102	100.00
Total votes		7,102	100.00
Republican hold			

=== District 18 ===
2022 Arkansas House of Representatives election, 18th district
Party	Candidate	Votes	%
Republican	Robin Lundstrum (incumbent)	6,399	62.33
Democratic	Monique Jones	3,868	37.67
Total votes		10,267	100.00

=== District 19 ===
2022 Arkansas House of Representatives election, 19th district
Party	Candidate	Votes	%
Republican	Steve Unger	4,517	53.85
Democratic	Paula Irwin	3,871	46.15
Total votes		8,388	100.00

=== District 20 ===
2022 Arkansas House of Representatives election, 20th district
Party	Candidate	Votes	%
Democratic	Denise Garner (incumbent)	9,011	100.00
Total votes		9,011	100.00
Democratic hold			

=== District 21 ===
2022 Arkansas House of Representatives election, 21st district
Party	Candidate	Votes	%
Democratic	Nicole Clowney (incumbent)	5,200	100.00
Total votes		5,200	100.00
Democratic hold			

=== District 22 ===
2022 Arkansas House of Representatives election, 22nd district
Party	Candidate	Votes	%
Democratic	David Whitaker (incumbent)	4,534	52.51
Republican	Brian Hester	4,100	47.49
Total votes		8,634	100.00

=== District 23 ===
2022 Arkansas House of Representatives election, 23rd district
Party	Candidate	Votes	%
Republican	Kendra Moore	7,104	72.65
Libertarian	Ryan Hanson	2,674	27.35
Total votes		9,778	100.00

=== District 24 ===
2022 Arkansas House of Representatives election, 24th district
Party	Candidate	Votes	%
Republican	Charlene Fite (incumbent)	8,198	100.00
Total votes		8,198	100.00
Republican hold			

=== District 25 ===
2022 Arkansas House of Representatives election, 25th district
Party	Candidate	Votes	%
Republican	Chad Puryear	7,738	68.83
Democratic	Caitlin Oxford	3,505	31.17
Total votes		11,243	100.00

=== District 26 ===
2022 Arkansas House of Representatives election, 26th district
Party	Candidate	Votes	%
Republican	Mark H. Berry (incumbent)	6,895	100.00
Total votes		6,895	100.00
Republican hold			

=== District 27 ===
2022 Arkansas House of Representatives election, 27th district
Party	Candidate	Votes	%
Republican	Steven Walker	10,219	100.00
Total votes		10,219	100.00
Republican hold			

=== District 28 ===
2022 Arkansas House of Representatives election, 28th district
Party	Candidate	Votes	%
Republican	Bart Schulz	6,283	100.00
Total votes		6,283	100.00
Republican hold			

=== District 29 ===
2022 Arkansas House of Representatives election, 29th district
Party	Candidate	Votes	%
Republican	Rick McClure (incumbent)	6,716	76.58
Democratic	Ronald Vaden	2,054	23.42
Total votes		8,770	100.00

=== District 30 ===
2022 Arkansas House of Representatives election, 30th district
Party	Candidate	Votes	%
Republican	Frances Cavenaugh (incumbent)	6,641	81.09
Libertarian	Cheryl Primm	1,549	18.91
Total votes		8,190	100.00

=== District 31 ===
2022 Arkansas House of Representatives election, 31st district
Party	Candidate	Votes	%
Republican	Jimmy Gazaway (incumbent)	6,751	100.00
Total votes		6,751	100.00
Republican hold			

=== District 32 ===
2022 Arkansas House of Representatives election, 32nd district
Party	Candidate	Votes	%
Republican	Jack Ladyman (incumbent)	4,643	65.50
Libertarian	Eric I. McGee	2,446	34.50
Total votes		7,089	100.00

=== District 33 ===
2022 Arkansas House of Representatives election, 33rd district
Party	Candidate	Votes	%
Republican	Jon Milligan (incumbent)	7,011	100.00
Total votes		7,011	100.00
Republican hold			

=== District 34 ===
2022 Arkansas House of Representatives election, 34th district
Party	Candidate	Votes	%
Republican	Joey Carr	3,276	54.10
Democratic	Ollie Collins	2,779	45.90
Total votes		6,055	100.00

=== District 35 ===
2022 Arkansas House of Representatives election, 35th district
Party	Candidate	Votes	%
Democratic	Milton Nicks Jr. (incumbent)	5,782	100.00
Total votes		5,782	100.00
Democratic hold			

=== District 36 ===
2022 Arkansas House of Representatives election, 36th district
Party	Candidate	Votes	%
Republican	Johnny Rye (incumbent)	5,126	100.00
Total votes		5,126	100.00
Republican hold			

=== District 37 ===
2022 Arkansas House of Representatives election, 37th district
Party	Candidate	Votes	%
Republican	Steve Hollowell (incumbent)	6,123	71.96
Democratic	Christopher Joseph Reed	2,132	25.06
Libertarian	Brian E. Ramsey	254	2.99
Total votes		8,509	100.00

=== District 38 ===
2022 Arkansas House of Representatives election, 38th district
Party	Candidate	Votes	%
Republican	Dwight Tosh (incumbent)	7,864	100.00
Total votes		7,864	100.00
Republican hold			

=== District 39 ===
2022 Arkansas House of Representatives election, 39th district
Party	Candidate	Votes	%
Republican	Wayne Long	6,341	82.50
Libertarian	Clayton Hall	1,345	17.50
Total votes		7,686	100.00

=== District 40 ===
2022 Arkansas House of Representatives election, 40th district
Party	Candidate	Votes	%
Republican	Shad Pearce (incumbent)	7,476	100.00
Total votes		7,476	100.00
Republican hold			

=== District 41 ===
2022 Arkansas House of Representatives election, 41st district
Party	Candidate	Votes	%
Republican	Josh Miller (incumbent)	10,097	84.63
Libertarian	Edward M. Flanigan III	1,834	15.37
Total votes		11,931	100.00

=== District 42 ===
2022 Arkansas House of Representatives election, 42nd district
Party	Candidate	Votes	%
Republican	Stephen Meeks (incumbent)	10,158	100.00
Total votes		10,158	100.00
Republican hold			

=== District 43 ===
2022 Arkansas House of Representatives election, 43rd district
Party	Candidate	Votes	%
Republican	Rick Beck (incumbent)	8,656	100.00
Total votes		8,656	100.00
Republican hold			

=== District 44 ===
2022 Arkansas House of Representatives election, 44th district
Party	Candidate	Votes	%
Republican	Stan Berry (incumbent)	8,230	100.00
Total votes		8,230	100.00
Republican hold			

=== District 45 ===
2022 Arkansas House of Representatives election, 45th district
Party	Candidate	Votes	%
Republican	Aaron Pilkington (incumbent)	1,735	100.00
Total votes		1,735	100.00
Republican hold			

=== District 46 ===
2022 Arkansas House of Representatives election, 46th district
Party	Candidate	Votes	%
Republican	Jon S. Eubanks (incumbent)	8,083	100.00
Total votes		8,083	100.00
Republican hold			

=== District 47 ===
2022 Arkansas House of Representatives election, 47th district
Party	Candidate	Votes	%
Republican	Lee Johnson (incumbent)	9,721	100.00
Total votes		9,721	100.00
Republican hold			

=== District 48 ===
2022 Arkansas House of Representatives election, 48th district
Party	Candidate	Votes	%
Republican	Ryan A. Rose	5,942	100.00
Total votes		5,942	100.00
Republican hold			

=== District 49 ===
2022 Arkansas House of Representatives election, 49th district
Party	Candidate	Votes	%
Democratic	Jay Richardson (incumbent)	1,972	58.36
Republican	Max Avery	1,407	41.64
Total votes		3,379	100.00

=== District 50 ===
2022 Arkansas House of Representatives election, 50th district
Party	Candidate	Votes	%
Republican	Zack Gramlich	4,878	62.92
Democratic	Diane Osborne	2,553	32.93
Libertarian	Stephen Edwards	322	4.15
Total votes		7,753	100.00

=== District 51 ===
2022 Arkansas House of Representatives election, 51st district
Party	Candidate	Votes	%
Republican	Cindy Crawford (incumbent)	8,604	100.00
Total votes		8,604	100.00
Republican hold			

=== District 52 ===
2022 Arkansas House of Representatives election, 52nd district
Party	Candidate	Votes	%
Republican	Marcus Richmond (incumbent)	6,179	75.34
Independent	John Wayne Catlett	2,023	24.66
Total votes		8,202	100.00

=== District 53 ===
2022 Arkansas House of Representatives election, 53rd district
Party	Candidate	Votes	%
Republican	Matt Duffield	5,782	100.00
Total votes		5,782	100.00
Republican hold			

=== District 54 ===
2022 Arkansas House of Representatives election, 54th district
Party	Candidate	Votes	%
Republican	Mary Bentley (incumbent)	8,866	100.00
Total votes		8,866	100.00
Republican hold			

=== District 55 ===
2022 Arkansas House of Representatives election, 55th district
Party	Candidate	Votes	%
Republican	Matt Brown	5,256	57.75
Democratic	Dee Sanders	3,845	42.25
Total votes		9,101	100.00

=== District 56 ===
2022 Arkansas House of Representatives election, 56th district
Party	Candidate	Votes	%
Democratic	Steve Magie (incumbent)	4,052	48.43
Republican	Trent Minner	4,042	48.31
Libertarian	Howard Heffington	273	3.26
Total votes		8,367	100.00

=== District 57 ===
2022 Arkansas House of Representatives election, 57th district
Party	Candidate	Votes	%
Republican	Cameron Cooper (incumbent)	9,048	87.14
Libertarian	Joshua Michael Huckaba	1,335	12.86
Total votes		10,383	100.00

=== District 58 ===
2022 Arkansas House of Representatives election, 58th district
Party	Candidate	Votes	%
Republican	Les Eaves (incumbent)	7,321	80.00
Democratic	Shantella Shantel Davis	1,830	20.00
Total votes		9,151	100.00

=== District 59 ===
2022 Arkansas House of Representatives election, 59th district
Party	Candidate	Votes	%
Republican	Jim Wooten (incumbent)	6,861	80.96
Democratic	William Alcott	1,308	15.43
Libertarian	Kai Schulz	306	3.61
Total votes		8,475	100.00

=== District 60 ===
2022 Arkansas House of Representatives election, 60th district
Party	Candidate	Votes	%
Republican	Roger Lynch (incumbent)	8,673	100.00
Total votes		8,673	100.00

=== District 61 ===
2022 Arkansas House of Representatives election, 61st district
Party	Candidate	Votes	%
Republican	Jeremiah Moore	5,984	68.05
Democratic	Bruce Martin	2,588	29.43
Libertarian	Garrett Sheeks	221	2.51
Total votes		8,793	100.00

=== District 62 ===
2022 Arkansas House of Representatives election, 62nd district
Party	Candidate	Votes	%
Republican	Mark McElroy (incumbent)	3,969	51.27
Democratic	Dexter R. Miller	3,772	48.73
Total votes		7,741	100.00

=== District 63 ===
2022 Arkansas House of Representatives election, 63rd district
Party	Candidate	Votes	%
Democratic	Deborah Ferguson (incumbent)	5,239	100.00
Total votes		5,239	100.00
Democratic hold			

=== District 64 ===
2022 Arkansas House of Representatives election, 64th district
Party	Candidate	Votes	%
Democratic	Ken Ferguson (incumbent)	6,302	100.00
Total votes		6,302	100.00
Democratic hold			

=== District 65 ===
2022 Arkansas House of Representatives election, 65th district
Party	Candidate	Votes	%
Democratic	Vivian Flowers (incumbent)	4,560	80.18
Libertarian	Richard Wilson	1,127	19.82
Total votes		5,687	100.00

=== District 66 ===
2022 Arkansas House of Representatives election, 66th district
Party	Candidate	Votes	%
Democratic	Mark Perry (incumbent)	5,016	100.00
Total votes		5,016	100.00
Democratic hold			

=== District 67 ===
2022 Arkansas House of Representatives election, 67th district
Party	Candidate	Votes	%
Republican	Karilyn Brown (incumbent)	5,185	52.59
Democratic	Jannie M. Cotton	4,675	47.41
Total votes		9,860	100.00

=== District 68 ===
2022 Arkansas House of Representatives election, 68th district
Party	Candidate	Votes	%
Republican	Brian S. Evans (incumbent)	7,465	83.46
Libertarian	Robert Betzold	1,479	16.54
Total votes		8,944	100.00

=== District 69 ===
2022 Arkansas House of Representatives election, 69th district
Party	Candidate	Votes	%
Republican	David Ray (incumbent)	6,334	69.09
Democratic	Zachary A. Culp	2,834	30.91
Total votes		9,168	100.00

=== District 70 ===
2022 Arkansas House of Representatives election, 70th district
Party	Candidate	Votes	%
Republican	Carlton Wing (incumbent)	6,378	54.09
Democratic	S. Judson Scanlon	5,080	43.08
Libertarian	Peyton Perks	334	2.83
Total votes		11,792	100.00

=== District 71 ===
2022 Arkansas House of Representatives election, 71st district
Party	Candidate	Votes	%
Republican	Brandon Achor	5,577	57.79
Democratic	John J. Pack	3,817	39.55
Libertarian	Aaron Robert Raatz	257	2.66
Total votes		9,651	100.00

=== District 72 ===
2022 Arkansas House of Representatives election, 72nd district
Party	Candidate	Votes	%
Democratic	Jamie Aleshia Scott (incumbent)	4,583	100.00
Total votes		4,583	100.00
Democratic hold			

=== District 73 ===
2022 Arkansas House of Representatives election, 73rd district
Party	Candidate	Votes	%
Democratic	Andrew Collins (incumbent)	7,881	58.98
Republican	Jon Wickliffe	5,266	39.41
Libertarian	Miles McDonnell	216	1.62
Total votes		13,363	100.00

=== District 74 ===
2022 Arkansas House of Representatives election, 74th district
Party	Candidate	Votes	%
Democratic	Tippi McCullough (incumbent)	9,002	77.74
Libertarian	Ashton "Coach Wink" Winkelmeyer	2,578	22.26
Total votes		11,580	100.00

=== District 75 ===
2022 Arkansas House of Representatives election, 75th district
Party	Candidate	Votes	%
Democratic	Ashley Hudson (incumbent)	6,498	54.85
Republican	Heather Turchi	5,349	45.15
Total votes		11,847	100.00

=== District 76 ===
2022 Arkansas House of Representatives election, 76th district
Party	Candidate	Votes	%
Democratic	Joy Springer (incumbent)	5,576	90.18
Libertarian	Genni Sutanto	607	9.82
Total votes		6,183	100.00

=== District 77 ===
2022 Arkansas House of Representatives election, 77th district
Party	Candidate	Votes	%
Democratic	Fred Allen (incumbent)	6,708	100.00
Total votes		6,708	100.00
Democratic hold			

=== District 78 ===
2022 Arkansas House of Representatives election, 78th district
Party	Candidate	Votes	%
Republican	Keith Brooks (incumbent)	10,633	100.00
Total votes		10,633	100.00

=== District 79 ===
2022 Arkansas House of Representatives election, 79th district
Party	Candidate	Votes	%
Democratic	Tara Shephard	5,121	100.00
Total votes		5,121	100.00
Democratic hold			

=== District 80 ===
2022 Arkansas House of Representatives election, 80th district
Party	Candidate	Votes	%
Democratic	Denise Ennett (incumbent)	5,837	100.00
Total votes		5,837	100.00
Democratic hold			

=== District 81 ===
2022 Arkansas House of Representatives election, 81st district
Party	Candidate	Votes	%
Republican	R.J. Hawk	5,320	61.33
Democratic	Roy Vaughn	3,043	35.08
Libertarian	Greg Sharp	312	3.60
Total votes		8,675	100.00

=== District 82 ===
2022 Arkansas House of Representatives election, 82nd district
Party	Candidate	Votes	%
Republican	Tony Furman (incumbent)	5,562	72.47
Libertarian	Brandon Kelley	2,113	27.53
Total votes		7,675	100.00

=== District 83 ===
2022 Arkansas House of Representatives election, 83rd district
Party	Candidate	Votes	%
Republican	Lanny Fite (incumbent)	11,300	82.18
Libertarian	Jason Reeves	2,451	17.82
Total votes		13,751	100.00

=== District 84 ===
2022 Arkansas House of Representatives election, 84th district
Party	Candidate	Votes	%
Republican	Les Warren (incumbent)	5,495	63.68
Democratic	Michelle Gates Roberts	3,134	36.32
Total votes		8,629	100.00

=== District 85 ===
2022 Arkansas House of Representatives election, 85th district
Party	Candidate	Votes	%
Republican	Richard McGrew (incumbent)	8,564	100.00
Total votes		8,564	100.00

=== District 86 ===
2022 Arkansas House of Representatives election, 86th district
Party	Candidate	Votes	%
Republican	John Maddox (incumbent)	7,174	100.00
Total votes		7,174	100.00

=== District 87 ===
2022 Arkansas House of Representatives election, 87th district
Party	Candidate	Votes	%
Republican	DeAnn Vaught (incumbent)	6,026	76.98
Democratic	Chris Wolcott	1,523	19.46
Libertarian	Marc Rosson	279	3.56
Total votes		7,828	100.00

=== District 88 ===
2022 Arkansas House of Representatives election, 88th district
Party	Candidate	Votes	%
Republican	Danny Watson (incumbent)	2,446	100.00
Total votes		2,446	100.00

=== District 89 ===
2022 Arkansas House of Representatives election, 89th district
Party	Candidate	Votes	%
Republican	Justin Gonzales (incumbent)	6,387	100.00
Total votes		6,387	100.00

=== District 90 ===
2022 Arkansas House of Representatives election, 90th district
Party	Candidate	Votes	%
Republican	Richard Womack (incumbent)	7,452	100.00
Total votes		7,452	100.00

=== District 91 ===
2022 Arkansas House of Representatives election, 91st district
Party	Candidate	Votes	%
Republican	Bruce Cozart (incumbent)	6,153	66.58
Democratic	Judy Ladd	3,088	33.42
Total votes		9,241	100.00

=== District 92 ===
2022 Arkansas House of Representatives election, 92nd district
Party	Candidate	Votes	%
Republican	Julie Mayberry (incumbent)	8,664	84.92
Libertarian	Chris Hayes	1,538	15.08
Total votes		10,202	100.00

=== District 93 ===
2022 Arkansas House of Representatives election, 93rd district
Party	Candidate	Votes	%
Republican	Mike Holcomb (incumbent)	7,982	87.05
Libertarian	Aaron A. Cagle	1,187	12.95
Total votes		9,169	100.00

=== District 94 ===
2022 Arkansas House of Representatives election, 94th district
Party	Candidate	Votes	%
Republican	Jeff Wardlaw (incumbent)	5,167	63.09
Democratic	Curley Jackson	3,023	36.91
Total votes		8,190	100.00

=== District 95 ===
2022 Arkansas House of Representatives election, 95th district
Party	Candidate	Votes	%
Republican	Howard Beaty (incumbent)	7,267	100.00
Total votes		7,267	100.00

=== District 96 ===
2022 Arkansas House of Representatives election, 96th district
Party	Candidate	Votes	%
Republican	Sonia Eubanks Barker (incumbent)	15,466	100.00
Total votes		15,466	100.00

=== District 97 ===
2022 Arkansas House of Representatives election, 97th district
Party	Candidate	Votes	%
Republican	Matthew Shepherd (incumbent)	9,896	100.00
Total votes		9,896	100.00

=== District 98 ===
2022 Arkansas House of Representatives election, 98th district
Party	Candidate	Votes	%
Republican	Wade Andrews	4,879	54.44
Democratic	David Fielding (incumbent)	4,083	45.56
Total votes		8,962	100.00

=== District 99 ===
2022 Arkansas House of Representatives election, 99th district
Party	Candidate	Votes	%
Republican	Lane Jean (incumbent)	7,419	86.85
Libertarian	Paul E. Green	1,123	13.15
Total votes		8,542	100.00

=== District 100 ===
2022 Arkansas House of Representatives election, 100th district
Party	Candidate	Votes	%
Republican	Carol Dalby (incumbent)	5,388	77.86
Libertarian	Luke Robertson	1,532	22.14
Total votes		6,920	100.00

== See also ==
- 2022 Arkansas elections
- 2022 Arkansas Senate election
- List of Arkansas General Assemblies
