= 2020 Arkansas House of Representatives election =

- November 3, 2020

All 100 seats in the Arkansas House of Representatives 51 seats needed for a majority

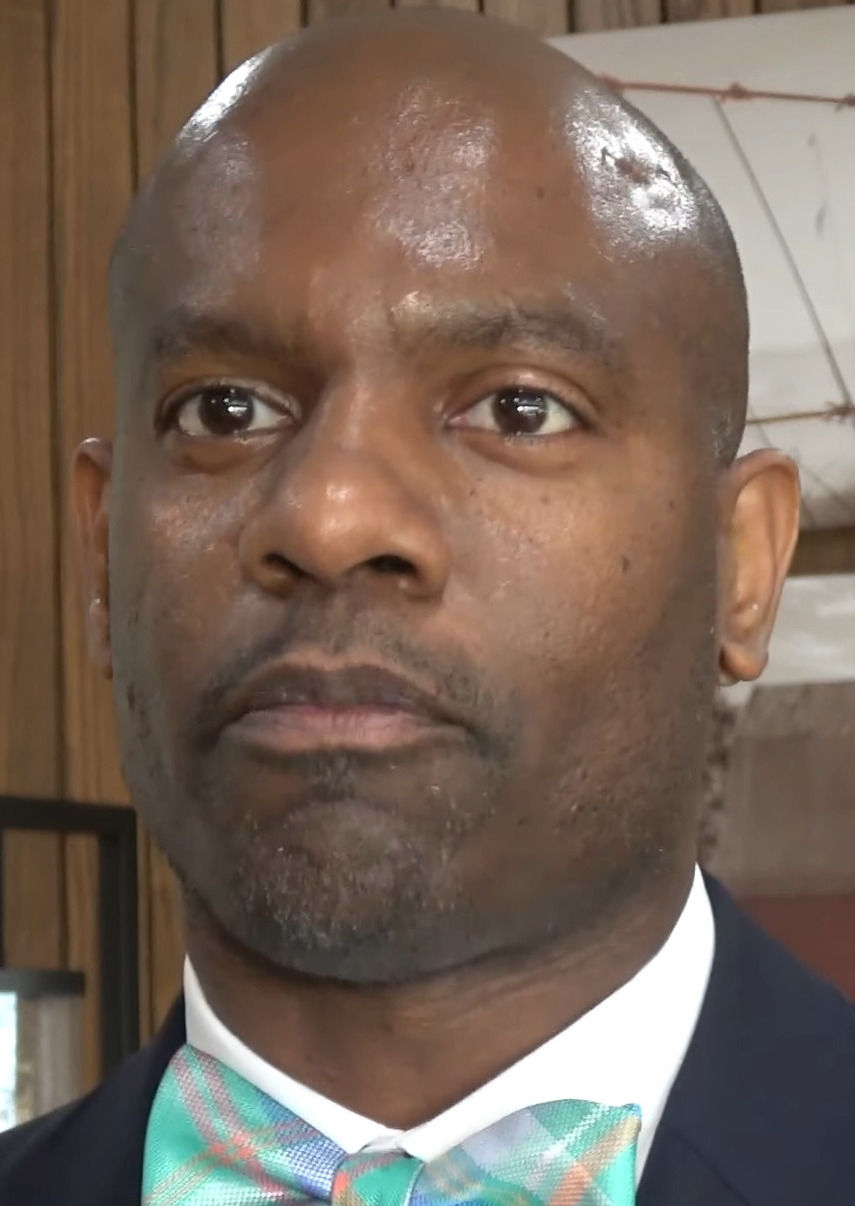
	Majority party	Minority party
Leader	Matthew Shepherd	Fredrick Love
Party	Republican	Democratic
Leader since	June 15, 2018	May 16, 2019
Leader's seat	6th	29th
Seats before	76	24
Seats won	77	23
Seat change	▲1	▼1
Popular vote	772,967	313,643
Percentage	70.09%	28.44%
- Republican gain Democratic gain Republican hold Democratic hold 50–60% 60–70% 70–80% 80–90% >90% 50–60% 70–80% 80–90% >90%
Speaker before election
Matthew Shepherd
Republican
Elected Speaker
Matthew Shepherd
Republican

The 2020 Arkansas House of Representatives elections were held on November 3, 2020. Elections were held to elect representatives from all 100 House of Representatives districts across the U.S. state of Arkansas. It was held alongside numerous other federal, state, and local elections, including the 2020 Arkansas Senate elections.

Prior to the election, the National Conference of State Legislatures labeled this as one of many state and local races throughout the country that could affect partisan balance during post-census redistricting.

Republicans expanded their supermajority from 76–24 to 77–23, flipping the 9th and 11th districts, while Democrats flipped the 32nd district. While Arkansas was long a practically single-party state dominated by the Democratic Party during the Solid South, the rise of the Southern Strategy and the realignment of political parties has turned it and most other southern states into Republican strongholds. Republicans have controlled the House since the 2012 elections. Democratic strength is mostly isolated to Little Rock, the state capital and largest city, and Fayetteville, home to the University of Arkansas, as well as the Black Belt along the Mississippi Delta, with large populations of rural African Americans.

== Predictions ==
Source	Ranking	As of
The Cook Political Report	Safe R	October 21, 2020

== Results ==
=== Overall ===
Parties	Votes	%	Seats	±
Republican	772,967	70.09%	78	▲2
Democratic	313,643	28.44%	22	▼2
Libertarian	12,564	1.14%	0	Steady
Independent	3676	0.33%	0	Steady

Summary of the November 3, 2020 Arkansas House of Representatives election results
Party	Candidates	Votes	%	Seats	+/–	%
Republican	85	772,967	70.09%	78	▲2	78%
Democratic	54	313,643	28.44%	22	▼2	22%
Libertarian	4	12,564	1.14%	0	–	0%
Independent	2	3,676	0.33%	0	–	0%
Total	145	1,102,850	100.00%	100	–	

Popular vote
Republican	70.09%
Democratic	28.44%
Libertarian	1.14%
Independent	0.33%

House seats won
Republican	78%
Democratic	22%

=== Closest races ===
Seats where the margin of victory was under 10%:

1. District 38, 0.12%
2. District 32, 0.14% gain
3. District 11, 0.54% gain
4. District 9, 4.52% gain
5. District 12, 5% ineligible
6. District 39, 5.9%
7. District 94, 9.42%

=== District 1 ===
2020 Arkansas House of Representatives election, 1st district
Party	Candidate	Votes	%
Republican	Carol Dalby (incumbent)	8,522	100%
Total votes		8,522	100%
Republican hold			

=== District 2 ===
2020 Arkansas House of Representatives election, 2nd district
Party	Candidate	Votes	%
Republican	Lane Jean (incumbent)	11,309	100%
Total votes		11,309	100%
Republican hold			

=== District 3 ===
2020 Arkansas House of Representatives election, 3rd district
Party	Candidate	Votes	%
Republican	Danny Watson (incumbent)	6,444	69.35%
Democratic	Larry D. Faulkner, Sr.	2,848	30.65%
Majority		3,596	38.70%
Total votes		9,292	100%
Republican hold			

=== District 4 ===
2020 Arkansas House of Representatives election, 4th district
Party	Candidate	Votes	%
Republican	DeAnn Vaught (incumbent)	4,498	100%
Total votes		4,498	100%
Republican hold			

=== District 5 ===
2020 Arkansas House of Representatives election, 5th district
Party	Candidate	Votes	%
Democratic	David Fielding (incumbent)	5,242	56.76%
Republican	Chase McDowell	3,993	43.24%
Majority		1,249	13.52%
Total votes		9,235	100%
Democratic hold			

=== District 6 ===
2020 Arkansas House of Representatives election, 6th district
Party	Candidate	Votes	%
Republican	Matthew J. Shepherd (incumbent)	11,610	100%
Total votes		11,610	100%
Republican hold			

=== District 7 ===
2020 Arkansas House of Representatives election, 7th district
Party	Candidate	Votes	%
Republican	Sonia Eubanks Barker (incumbent)	6,239	59.92%
Democratic	George Calloway, Jr.	4,174	40.08%
Majority		2,065	19.84%
Total votes		10,413	100%
Republican hold			

=== District 8 ===
2020 Arkansas House of Representatives election, 8th district
Party	Candidate	Votes	%
Republican	Jeffrey R. Wardlaw (incumbent)	6,966	69.62%
Democratic	Christopher Ogburn	3,040	30.38%
Majority		3,926	39.24%
Total votes		10,006	100%
Republican hold			

=== District 9 ===
2020 Arkansas House of Representatives election, 9th district
Party	Candidate	Votes	%
Republican	Howard Beaty	5,339	52.27%
Democratic	LeAnne Burch (incumbent)	4,875	47.75%
Majority		464	4.54%
Total votes		10,214	100%
Republican gain from Democratic			

=== District 10 ===
2020 Arkansas House of Representatives election, 10th district
Party	Candidate	Votes	%
Republican	Mike Holcomb (incumbent)	10,177	100%
Total votes		10,177	100%
Republican hold			

=== District 11 ===
2020 Arkansas House of Representatives election, 11th district
Party	Candidate	Votes	%
Republican	Mark D. McElroy	4,854	50.27%
Democratic	Don Edward Glover (incumbent)	4,802	49.73%
Majority		52	0.54%
Total votes		9,656	100%
Republican gain from Democratic			

=== District 12 ===
Democrat Jimmie L. Wilson narrowly won by 5 percentage points ahead of Republican David Tollett, but Wilson was unanimously ruled ineligible to serve as a state representative by the Arkansas Supreme Court on October 26, 2020. Wilson was convicted of a misdemeanor 30 years earlier for "illegal use of federal farm loans and selling mortgaged crops." Despite being pardoned by President Bill Clinton in 2001, the court found a 2016 amendment to the Arkansas Constitution barring those who have been convicted of "deceit, fraud or false statement" from serving in public office barred Wilson from serving.

2020 Arkansas House of Representatives election, 12th district
Party	Candidate	Votes	%
Republican	David Tollett	3,491	47.50%
Democratic	Jimmie L. Wilson	3,859	52.50%
Majority		-368	-5.00%
Total votes		7,347	100%
Republican gain from Democratic			

=== District 13 ===
2020 Arkansas House of Representatives election, 13th district
Party	Candidate	Votes	%
Republican	David Hillman (incumbent)	8,762	100%
Total votes		8,762	100%
Republican hold			

=== District 14 ===
2020 Arkansas House of Representatives election, 14th district
Party	Candidate	Votes	%
Republican	Roger Dale Lynch (incumbent)	7,005	58.75%
Democratic	Rick Bransford	3,964	33.25%
Independent	Christia Jones	954	8.00%
Majority		3,041	25.50%
Total votes		11,923	100%
Republican hold			

=== District 15 ===
2020 Arkansas House of Representatives election, 15th district
Party	Candidate	Votes	%
Republican	Ken Bragg (incumbent)	11,074	84.90%
Libertarian	Wayne Willems	1,970	15.10%
Majority		9,104	69.80%
Total votes		13,044	100%
Republican hold			

=== District 16 ===
2020 Arkansas House of Representatives election, 16th district
Party	Candidate	Votes	%
Democratic	Ken Ferguson (incumbent)	9,511	100%
Total votes		9,511	100%
Democratic hold			

=== District 17 ===
2020 Arkansas House of Representatives election, 17th district
Party	Candidate	Votes	%
Democratic	Vivian Flowers (incumbent)	6,094	100%
Total votes		6,094	100%
Democratic hold			

=== District 18 ===
2020 Arkansas House of Representatives election, 18th district
Party	Candidate	Votes	%
Republican	Richard Womack (incumbent)	10,128	100%
Total votes		10,128	100%
Republican hold			

=== District 19 ===
2020 Arkansas House of Representatives election, 19th district
Party	Candidate	Votes	%
Republican	Justin Gonzales (incumbent)	9,095	100%
Total votes		9,095	100%
Republican hold			

=== District 20 ===
2020 Arkansas House of Representatives election, 20th district
Party	Candidate	Votes	%
Republican	John Maddox (incumbent)	11,017	100%
Total votes		11,017	100%
Republican hold			

=== District 21 ===
2020 Arkansas House of Representatives election, 21st district
Party	Candidate	Votes	%
Republican	Marcus Richmond (incumbent)	11,226	100%
Total votes		11,226	100%
Republican hold			

=== District 22 ===
2020 Arkansas House of Representatives election, 22nd district
Party	Candidate	Votes	%
Republican	Richard McGrew	12,400	74.94%
Libertarian	Judy Bowers	4,146	25.06%
Majority		8,254	49.88%
Total votes		16,546	100%
Republican hold			

=== District 23 ===
2020 Arkansas House of Representatives election, 23rd district
Party	Candidate	Votes	%
Republican	Lanny Fite (incumbent)	16,838	100%
Total votes		16,838	100%
Republican hold			

=== District 24 ===
2020 Arkansas House of Representatives election, 24th district
Party	Candidate	Votes	%
Republican	Bruce Cozart (incumbent)	11,970	100%
Total votes		11,970	100%
Republican hold			

=== District 25 ===
2020 Arkansas House of Representatives election, 25th district
Party	Candidate	Votes	%
Republican	Les Warren (incumbent)	9,862	100%
Total votes		9,862	100%
Republican hold			

=== District 26 ===
2020 Arkansas House of Representatives election, 26th district
Party	Candidate	Votes	%
Republican	Rick McClure	8,327	71.59%
Democratic	Joyce Schimenti	3,304	28.41%
Majority		5,023	43.18%
Total votes		11,631	100%
Republican hold			

=== District 27 ===
2020 Arkansas House of Representatives election, 27th district
Party	Candidate	Votes	%
Republican	Julie Mayberry (incumbent)	12,364	100%
Total votes		12,364	100%
Republican hold			

=== District 28 ===
2020 Arkansas House of Representatives election, 28th district
Party	Candidate	Votes	%
Republican	Tony Furman	10,684	100%
Total votes		10,684	100%
Republican hold			

=== District 29 ===
2020 Arkansas House of Representatives election, 29th district
Party	Candidate	Votes	%
Democratic	Fredrick Love (incumbent)	7,557	100%
Total votes		7,557	100%
Democratic hold			

=== District 30 ===
2020 Arkansas House of Representatives election, 30th district
Party	Candidate	Votes	%
Democratic	Fred Allen	11,044	100%
Total votes		11,044	100%
Democratic hold			

=== District 31 ===
2020 Arkansas House of Representatives election, 31st district
Party	Candidate	Votes	%
Republican	Keith Brooks	13,702	69.37%
Democratic	Mazhil Rajendran	6,051	30.63%
Majority		7,651	38.74%
Total votes		19,753	100%
Republican hold			

=== District 32 ===
2020 Arkansas House of Representatives election, 32nd district
Party	Candidate	Votes	%
Democratic	Ashley Hudson	8,404	50.07%
Republican	Jim Sorvillo (incumbent)	8,380	49.93%
Majority		24	0.14%
Total votes		16,784	100%
Democratic gain from Republican			

=== District 33 ===
2020 Arkansas House of Representatives election, 33rd district
Party	Candidate	Votes	%
Democratic	Tippi McCullough (incumbent)	11,734	100%
Total votes		11,734	100%
Democratic hold			

=== District 34 ===
2020 Arkansas House of Representatives election, 34th district
Party	Candidate	Votes	%
Democratic	Joy C. Springer	6,463	70.36%
Independent	Roderick Greer Talley	2,722	29.64%
Majority		3,741	40.72%
Total votes		9,185	100%
Democratic hold			

=== District 35 ===
2020 Arkansas House of Representatives election, 35th district
Party	Candidate	Votes	%
Democratic	Andrew Collins (incumbent)	12,638	100%
Total votes		12,638	100%
Democratic hold			

=== District 36 ===
2020 Arkansas House of Representatives election, 36th district
Party	Candidate	Votes	%
Democratic	Denise Ennett (incumbent)	8,180	100%
Total votes		8,180	100%
Democratic hold			

=== District 37 ===
2020 Arkansas House of Representatives election, 37th district
Party	Candidate	Votes	%
Democratic	Jamie Aleshia Scott (incumbent)	7,727	100%
Total votes		7,727	100%
Democratic hold			

=== District 38 ===
2020 Arkansas House of Representatives election, 38th district
Party	Candidate	Votes	%
Republican	Carlton Wing (incumbent)	7,099	50.06%
Democratic	Matthew Stallings	7,083	49.94%
Majority		16	0.12%
Total votes		14,182	100%
Republican hold			

=== District 39 ===
2020 Arkansas House of Representatives election, 39th district
Party	Candidate	Votes	%
Republican	Mark Lowery (incumbent)	7,838	52.95%
Democratic	Kayla Applegate	6,966	47.05%
Majority		872	5.90%
Total votes		14,804	100%
Republican hold			

=== District 40 ===
2020 Arkansas House of Representatives election, 40th district
Party	Candidate	Votes	%
Republican	David Ray	11,930	100%
Total votes		11,930	100%
Republican hold			

=== District 41 ===
2020 Arkansas House of Representatives election, 41st district
Party	Candidate	Votes	%
Republican	Karilyn Brown (incumbent)	8,390	55.12%
Democratic	Jannie M. Cotton	6,966	44.88%
Majority		1,558	10.24%
Total votes		15,222	100%
Republican hold			

=== District 42 ===
2020 Arkansas House of Representatives election, 42nd district
Party	Candidate	Votes	%
Democratic	Mark Perry (incumbent)	7,241	100%
Total votes		7,241	100%
Democratic hold			

=== District 43 ===
2020 Arkansas House of Representatives election, 43rd district
Party	Candidate	Votes	%
Republican	Brian S. Evans (incumbent)	12,064	100%
Total votes		12,064	100%
Republican hold			

=== District 44 ===
2020 Arkansas House of Representatives election, 44th district
Party	Candidate	Votes	%
Republican	Cameron Cooper (incumbent)	11,737	83.71%
Democratic	Rodney Govens	2,284	16.29%
Majority		9,453	67.42%
Total votes		14,021	100%
Republican hold			

=== District 45 ===
According to Ballotpedia, the general election in the 45th House district was cancelled, with incumbent Republican Jim Wooten winning without appearing on the ballot.

=== District 46 ===
According to Ballotpedia, the general election in the 46th House district was cancelled, with incumbent Republican Les Eaves winning without appearing on the ballot.

=== District 47 ===
2020 Arkansas House of Representatives election, 47th district
Party	Candidate	Votes	%
Republican	Craig Christiansen (incumbent)	5,789	100%
Total votes		5,789	100%
Republican hold			

=== District 48 ===
2020 Arkansas House of Representatives election, 48th district
Party	Candidate	Votes	%
Democratic	Reginald Murdock (incumbent)	5,853	100%
Total votes		5,853	100%
Democratic hold			

=== District 49 ===
2020 Arkansas House of Representatives election, 49th district
Party	Candidate	Votes	%
Republican	Steve Hollowell(incumbent)	5,725	56.64%
Democratic	Justin Reeves	4,382	43.36%
Majority		1,343	13.28%
Total votes		10,107	100%
Republican hold			

=== District 50 ===
2020 Arkansas House of Representatives election, 50th district
Party	Candidate	Votes	%
Democratic	Milton Nicks, Jr. (incumbent)	7,197	100%
Total votes		7,197	100%
Democratic hold			

=== District 51 ===
2020 Arkansas House of Representatives election, 51st district
Party	Candidate	Votes	%
Democratic	Deborah Ferguson (incumbent)	7,961	100%
Total votes		7,961	100%
Democratic hold			

=== District 52 ===
2020 Arkansas House of Representatives election, 52nd district
Party	Candidate	Votes	%
Republican	Dwight Tosh (incumbent)	10,235	100%
Total votes		10,235	100%
Republican hold			

=== District 53 ===
2020 Arkansas House of Representatives election, 53rd district
Party	Candidate	Votes	%
Republican	Jon Milligan	9,086	76.37%
Democratic	Shawn Only	2,811	23.63%
Majority		6,275	52.74%
Total votes		11,897	100%
Republican hold			

=== District 54 ===
2020 Arkansas House of Representatives election, 54th district
Party	Candidate	Votes	%
Republican	Johnny Rye (incumbent)	8,091	100%
Total votes		8,091	100%
Republican hold			

=== District 55 ===
2020 Arkansas House of Representatives election, 55th district
Party	Candidate	Votes	%
Democratic	Monte Hodges (incumbent)	3,666	52.16%
Republican	Gary Tobar	3,362	47.84%
Majority		304	4.32%
Total votes		7,028	100%
Democratic hold			

=== District 56 ===
2020 Arkansas House of Representatives election, 56th district
Party	Candidate	Votes	%
Republican	Joe Jett (incumbent)	9,232	100%
Total votes		9,232	100%
Republican hold			

=== District 57 ===
2020 Arkansas House of Representatives election, 57th district
Party	Candidate	Votes	%
Republican	Jimmy Gazaway (incumbent)	10,530	100%
Total votes		10,530	100%
Republican hold			

=== District 58 ===
2020 Arkansas House of Representatives election, 58th district
Party	Candidate	Votes	%
Republican	Brandt Smith (incumbent)	7,667	61.75%
Democratic	Jim Burton	4,749	38.25%
Majority		2,918	23.50%
Total votes		12,416	100%
Republican hold			

=== District 59 ===
2020 Arkansas House of Representatives election, 59th district
Party	Candidate	Votes	%
Republican	Jack Ladyman (incumbent)	6,244	66.14%
Democratic	Reginald Prunty	3,196	33.86%
Majority		3,048	32.28%
Total votes		9,440	100%
Republican hold			

=== District 60 ===
2020 Arkansas House of Representatives election, 60th district
Party	Candidate	Votes	%
Republican	Frances Cavenaugh (incumbent)	9,899	100%
Total votes		9,899	100%
Republican hold			

=== District 61 ===
2020 Arkansas House of Representatives election, 61st district
Party	Candidate	Votes	%
Republican	Marsh Davis (incumbent)	10,313	100%
Total votes		10,313	100%
Republican hold			

=== District 62 ===
2020 Arkansas House of Representatives election, 62nd district
Party	Candidate	Votes	%
Republican	Michelle Gray (incumbent)	11,446	100%
Total votes		11,446	100%
Republican hold			

=== District 63 ===
2020 Arkansas House of Representatives election, 63rd district
Party	Candidate	Votes	%
Republican	Stu Smith (incumbent)	10,808	100%
Total votes		10,808	100%
Republican hold			

=== District 64 ===
2020 Arkansas House of Representatives election, 64th district
Party	Candidate	Votes	%
Republican	John Payton (incumbent)	13,333	100%
Total votes		13,333	100%
Republican hold			

=== District 65 ===
2020 Arkansas House of Representatives election, 65th district
Party	Candidate	Votes	%
Republican	Rick Beck (incumbent)	8,057	68.15%
Democratic	David Norman	3,766	31.85%
Majority		4,291	36.30%
Total votes		11,823	100%
Republican hold			

=== District 66 ===
2020 Arkansas House of Representatives election, 66th district
Party	Candidate	Votes	%
Republican	Josh Miller (incumbent)	9,318	100%
Total votes		9,318	100%
Republican hold			

=== District 67 ===
2020 Arkansas House of Representatives election, 67th district
Party	Candidate	Votes	%
Republican	Stephen Meeks (incumbent)	11,915	75.37%
Democratic	Steve Wilson	3,894	24.63%
Majority		8,021	50.74%
Total votes		15,809	100%
Republican hold			

=== District 68 ===
2020 Arkansas House of Representatives election, 68th district
Party	Candidate	Votes	%
Republican	Stan Berry (incumbent)	11,941	81.69%
Democratic	Lisa L. Hassell	2,677	18.31%
Majority		9,264	63.38%
Total votes		14,618	100%
Republican hold			

=== District 69 ===
2020 Arkansas House of Representatives election, 69th district
Party	Candidate	Votes	%
Republican	Aaron Pilkington (incumbent)	10,165	100%
Total votes		10,165	100%
Republican hold			

=== District 70 ===
2020 Arkansas House of Representatives election, 70th district
Party	Candidate	Votes	%
Republican	Spencer Hawks (incumbent)	13,256	100%
Total votes		13,256	100%
Republican hold			

=== District 71 ===
2020 Arkansas House of Representatives election, 71st district
Party	Candidate	Votes	%
Republican	Joe Cloud (incumbent)	8,161	100%
Total votes		8,161	100%
Republican hold			

=== District 72 ===
2020 Arkansas House of Representatives election, 72nd district
Party	Candidate	Votes	%
Democratic	Stephen Magie (incumbent)	6,419	58.02%
Republican	James B. Phillips	4,645	41.98%
Majority		1,774	16.04%
Total votes		11,064	100%
Democratic hold			

=== District 73 ===
2020 Arkansas House of Representatives election, 73rd district
Party	Candidate	Votes	%
Republican	Mary Bentley (incumbent)	8,653	100%
Total votes		8,653	100%
Republican hold			

=== District 74 ===
2020 Arkansas House of Representatives election, 74th district
Party	Candidate	Votes	%
Republican	Jon S. Eubanks (incumbent)	9,232	83.23%
Democratic	June Anteski	1,860	16.77%
Majority		7,372	66.46%
Total votes		11,092	100%
Republican hold			

=== District 75 ===
2020 Arkansas House of Representatives election, 75th district
Party	Candidate	Votes	%
Republican	Lee Johnson (incumbent)	12,964	100%
Total votes		12,964	100%
Republican hold			

=== District 76 ===
2020 Arkansas House of Representatives election, 76th district
Party	Candidate	Votes	%
Republican	Cindy Crawford (incumbent)	9,092	70.45%
Democratic	Caleb Harwell	3,814	29.55%
Majority		5,278	40.90%
Total votes		12,906	100%
Republican hold			

=== District 77 ===
2020 Arkansas House of Representatives election, 77th district
Party	Candidate	Votes	%
Republican	Justin Boyd (incumbent)	7,208	67.51%
Libertarian	Stephen Edwards	3,469	32.49%
Majority		3,739	35.02%
Total votes		10,677	100%
Republican hold			

=== District 78 ===
2020 Arkansas House of Representatives election, 78th district
Party	Candidate	Votes	%
Democratic	Jay Richardson	4,786	100%
Total votes		4,786	100%
Democratic hold			

=== District 79 ===
2020 Arkansas House of Representatives election, 79th district
Party	Candidate	Votes	%
Republican	Gary Deffenbaugh (incumbent)	8,846	100%
Total votes		8,846	100%
Republican hold			

=== District 80 ===
2020 Arkansas House of Representatives election, 80th district
Party	Candidate	Votes	%
Republican	Charlene Fite (incumbent)	10,506	72.13%
Democratic	Lou Reed Sharp	4,059	27.87%
Majority		6,447	44.26%
Total votes		14,565	100%
Republican hold			

=== District 81 ===
2020 Arkansas House of Representatives election, 81st district
Party	Candidate	Votes	%
Republican	Bruce Coleman (incumbent)	11,750	100%
Total votes		11,750	100%
Republican hold			

=== District 82 ===
2020 Arkansas House of Representatives election, 82nd district
Party	Candidate	Votes	%
Republican	Mark H. Berry	8,371	70.16%
Democratic	Gwen Ford Faulkenberry	3,560	29.84%
Majority		4,811	40.32%
Total votes		11,931	100%
Republican hold			

=== District 83 ===
2020 Arkansas House of Representatives election, 83rd district
Party	Candidate	Votes	%
Republican	Keith Slape (incumbent)	11,370	100%
Total votes		11,370	100%
Republican hold			

=== District 84 ===
2020 Arkansas House of Representatives election, 84th district
Party	Candidate	Votes	%
Democratic	Denise Garner (incumbent)	13,515	100%
Total votes		13,515	100%
Democratic hold			

=== District 85 ===
2020 Arkansas House of Representatives election, 85th district
Party	Candidate	Votes	%
Democratic	David Whitaker (incumbent)	9,092	55.26%
Republican	Brian Hester	7,360	44.74%
Majority		1,732	10.52%
Total votes		16,452	100%
Democratic hold			

=== District 86 ===
2020 Arkansas House of Representatives election, 86th district
Party	Candidate	Votes	%
Democratic	Nicole Clowney (incumbent)	8,386	70.19%
Republican	John S. LaTour	3,561	29.81%
Majority		4,825	40.38%
Total votes		11,947	100%
Democratic hold			

=== District 87 ===
2020 Arkansas House of Representatives election, 87th district
Party	Candidate	Votes	%
Republican	Robin Lundstrum	10,496	73.63%
Democratic	Michael Bennett-Spears	3,759	26.37%
Majority		6,737	47.26%
Total votes		14,255	100%
Republican hold			

=== District 88 ===
2020 Arkansas House of Representatives election, 88th district
Party	Candidate	Votes	%
Republican	Clint Penzo (incumbent)	6,476	59.53%
Democratic	Hawley Woods	4,402	40.47%
Majority		2,074	19.06%
Total votes		10,878	100%
Republican hold			

=== District 89 ===
2020 Arkansas House of Representatives election, 89th district
Party	Candidate	Votes	%
Democratic	Megan Godfrey (incumbent)	3,118	56.25%
Republican	Jed Duggar	2,425	43.75%
Majority		693	12.50%
Total votes		5,543	100%
Democratic hold			

=== District 90 ===
2020 Arkansas House of Representatives election, 90th district
Party	Candidate	Votes	%
Republican	Kendon Underwood	11,583	62.65%
Democratic	Kelly Ross Krout	6,904	37.35%
Majority		4,679	25.30%
Total votes		18,487	100%
Republican hold			

=== District 91 ===
2020 Arkansas House of Representatives election, 91st district
Party	Candidate	Votes	%
Republican	Delia Haak	13,471	72.49%
Democratic	Nick Jones	5,113	27.51%
Majority		8,358	44.98%
Total votes		18,584	100%
Republican hold			

=== District 92 ===
2020 Arkansas House of Representatives election, 92nd district
Party	Candidate	Votes	%
Republican	Gayle Hendren McKenzie	15,993	100%
Total votes		15,993	100%
Republican hold			

=== District 93 ===
2020 Arkansas House of Representatives election, 93rd district
Party	Candidate	Votes	%
Republican	Jim Dotson (incumbent)	10,446	58.11%
Democratic	Daisy Bonilla	7,530	41.89%
Majority		2,916	16.22%
Total votes		17,976	100%
Republican hold			

=== District 94 ===
2020 Arkansas House of Representatives election, 94th district
Party	Candidate	Votes	%
Republican	John P. Carr	5,654	54.71%
Democratic	Jene Huffman-Gilreath	4,681	45.29%
Majority		973	9.42%
Total votes		10,335	100%
Republican hold			

=== District 95 ===
2020 Arkansas House of Representatives election, 95th district
Party	Candidate	Votes	%
Republican	Austin McCollum (incumbent)	14,743	100%
Total votes		14,743	100%
Republican hold			

=== District 96 ===
2020 Arkansas House of Representatives election, 96th district
Party	Candidate	Votes	%
Republican	Joshua P. Bryant	7,838	64.50%
Democratic	Jon Comstock	4,313	35.50%
Majority		3,525	29.00%
Total votes		12,151	100%
Republican hold			

=== District 97 ===
2020 Arkansas House of Representatives election, 97th district
Party	Candidate	Votes	%
Republican	Harlan Breaux (incumbent)	9,083	59.71%
Democratic	Suzie Bell	6,129	40.29%
Majority		2,954	19.42%
Total votes		15,212	100%
Republican hold			

=== District 98 ===
2020 Arkansas House of Representatives election, 98th district
Party	Candidate	Votes	%
Republican	Ron McNair (incumbent)	8,124	100%
Total votes		8,124	100%
Republican hold			

=== District 99 ===
2020 Arkansas House of Representatives election, 99th district
Party	Candidate	Votes	%
Republican	Jack Fortner (incumbent)	11,965	100%
Total votes		11,965	100%
Republican hold			

=== District 100 ===
2020 Arkansas House of Representatives election, 100th district
Party	Candidate	Votes	%
Republican	Nelda Speaks (incumbent)	11,205	79.00%
Libertarian	Kevin Vornheder	2,979	21.00%
Majority		8,226	58.00%
Total votes		14,184	100%
Republican hold			

== See also ==
- 2020 Arkansas elections
- 2020 Arkansas Senate election
