= Frances Cavenaugh =

American politician

Member of the Arkansas House of Representatives from the 60th district
- In office January 2017 – January 9, 2023
- Succeeded by: Roger Lynch

Member of the Arkansas House of Representatives from the 30th district
- Incumbent
- Assumed office January 9, 2023
- Preceded by: Fred Allen

Personal details
- Party: Republican
- Spouse: Don Cavenaugh

Frances "Fran" Cavenaugh is an American politician who has served as a member of the Arkansas House of Representatives since January 2017. She currently represents Arkansas' 30th House district, which includes portions of Lawrence, Craighead, and Greene counties.

== Electoral history ==
She was first elected to the house in the 2016 Arkansas House of Representatives election to the 60th district. She was reelected to the seat in the 2018 Arkansas House of Representatives election. She was reelected to the seat in the 2020 Arkansas House of Representatives election. She was elected to the 30th district in the 2022 Arkansas House of Representatives election due to redistricting.

== Biography ==
She is a Baptist.
