= Talesha =

Talesha is a feminine given name.

== People with the given name ==
- Talesha Dokes, American politician
- Talesha Quinn (b.1989), Australia international rugby league footballer

== See also ==
- Aisha (given name)
- Alesha
- Lesha
- Tesha
- Taleshan
