= Daniel Holtmeyer =

American politician

Member-elect of the Arkansas House of Representatives from the 15th district
- Assuming office January 2027
- Succeeding: John P. Carr

Personal details
- Party: Democratic
- Website: Campaign website

Daniel Holtmeyer is an American politician. A member of the Democratic Party, he is the member-elect for the 15th district of the Arkansas House of Representatives. He unseated incumbent Republican John P. Carr in the 2026 election. He is a business owner. He is the first openly gay man elected in Arkansas.
