= Karilyn Brown =

American politician

Member of the Arkansas House of Representatives from the 67th district
- Incumbent
- Assumed office January 9, 2023
- Preceded by: Stephen Meeks

Member of the Arkansas House of Representatives from the 41st district
- In office January 2015 – January 9, 2023
- Succeeded by: Josh Miller

Personal details
- Party: Republican
- Education: Bachelor of Arts, Master of Arts in professional and technical writing
- Alma mater: University of Arkansas at Little Rock
- Profession: Technical writer

Karilyn B. Brown is an American politician who has served as a member of the Arkansas House of Representatives since January 1, 2015. She is a republican serving her 6th term, and currently represents Arkansas' 67th House district.

== Electoral history ==
She was first elected to the 41st district in the 2014 Arkansas House of Representatives election and started serving on January 1, 2015. She was reelected to the seat in the 2016 Arkansas House of Representatives election, 2018 Arkansas House of Representatives election, and 2020 Arkansas House of Representatives election. Due to redistricting, she ran for the 67th district in the 2022 Arkansas House of Representatives election, and won the seat.

== Political positions ==
Brown is anti-abortion.

== Biography ==
Brown earned a Bachelor of Arts and a Master of Arts in professional and technical writing from the University of Arkansas at Little Rock in 2007. Outside of politics, she is a technical writer specializing in scientific and medical research, manuals, proposals and reports.. She has served as a justice of the peace of the Pulaski County Quorum Court. She is a Lutheran.

She currently serves on several boards, including the Republican Woman's Club, the Nominations Committee for the Arkansas Federation of Republican Women and several others.
