= Josh Longmire =

American politician (born 1981)

Member of the Arkansas House of Representatives from the 30th district
- Succeeded by: Frances Cavenaugh

Personal details
- Born: 1981 (age 44–45) Jonesboro, Arkansas, U.S.
- Party: Republican
- Education: Arkansas State University

Josh Longmire (born 1981) is an American politician who is the member-elect of the Arkansas House of Representatives from the 30th district. Elected in 2026, he previously served on the quorum court of Craighead County.

Longmire was born in Jonesboro, Arkansas, in 1981 and raised in Hoxie. He graduated from Hoxie High School, where he was state chair for the Arkansas Teenage Republicans, in 1999 then from Arkansas State University in 2003.
