= Josh Miller (Arkansas politician) =

American politician (born 1981)

Member of the Arkansas House of Representatives from the 66th district
- In office January 14, 2013 – January 8, 2023
- Preceded by: Gary Deffenbaugh
- Succeeded by: Mark Perry

Member of the Arkansas House of Representatives from the 41st district
- In office January 9, 2023 – January 12, 2025
- Preceded by: Karilyn Brown
- Succeeded by: Alyssa Brown

Personal details
- Born: April 2, 1981 (age 45) Heber Springs, Arkansas, U.S.
- Party: Republican
- Spouse: Bethany Miller
- Parent(s): David and Glenda Miller
- Education: Arkansas State University-Beebe (AA)

Joshua D. Miller (born April 2, 1981) is an American politician who served for 12 years as a member of the Arkansas House of Representatives for the 66th and 41st districts. Elected in November 2012, he assumed office on January 14, 2013 and served until January 2025.

== Early life and education ==
Miller was born and raised in Heber Springs, Arkansas. He attended Arkansas Tech University and the University of Central Arkansas before earning an associate degree in political science from the Heber Springs campus of Arkansas State University-Beebe.

== Career ==
Miller was elected to the Arkansas House of Representatives in November 2012 and assumed office on January 14, 2013.

Miller's seat was relabeled District 41 starting with the 2022 election. He did not run for re-election in 2024 due to term limits.

== Personal life ==
Miller is married. Since suffering a spinal cord injury in 2003, he has used a motorized wheelchair.

Miller and his wife divorced some time before Nov. 8, 2025.
