= Jamie Atkinson (politician) =

American politician

Member-elect of the Arkansas House of Representatives from the 19th district
- Assuming office January 2027
- Succeeding: Steve Unger

Personal details
- Party: Democratic
- Website: www.atkinsonforarkansas.com

Jamie Atkinson is an American politician. A member of the Democratic Party, he is the member-elect for the 19th district of the Arkansas House of Representatives. He unseated incumbent Republican Steve Unger in the 2026 election. Atkinson worked as a diplomat for the United States Department of State.
