= Cynthia Nations =

American politician

Member-elect of the Arkansas House of Representatives from the 55th district
- Assuming office January 11, 2027
- Succeeding: Matthew Brown

Personal details
- Party: Democratic
- Website: Campaign website

Cynthia Nations is an American politician. A member of the Democratic Party, she is the member-elect for the 55th district of the Arkansas House of Representatives. She unseated incumbent Republican Matthew Brown in the 2026 election. She is a schoolteacher by profession.
