= Andrew Eberly =

American politician

Member-elect of the Arkansas House of Representatives from the 67th district
- Assuming office January 2027
- Succeeding: Karilyn Brown

Personal details
- Party: Democratic
- Website: andrewforar.com

Andrew Cade Eberly is an American politician. A member of the Democratic Party, he is the member-elect for the 67th district of the Arkansas House of Representatives. He unseated incumbent Republican Karilyn Brown in the 2026 election. He is an Army veteran, cybersecurity professional, and community advocate.
