= Mitchell Smith (politician) =

American politician

Member-elect of the Arkansas House of Representatives from the 13th district
- Assuming office January 2027
- Succeeding: Scott Richardson

Personal details
- Party: Democratic
- Website: smithforar.org

Mitchell Smith is an American politician. A member of the Democratic Party, he is the member-elect for the 13th district of the Arkansas House of Representatives. He unseated incumbent Republican Scott Richardson in the 2026 election.
