= Steven Person =

American politician

Member-elect of the Arkansas House of Representatives from the 77th district
- Assuming office January 2027
- Succeeding: Fred Allen

Personal details
- Party: Democratic
- Website: www.stevenforarkansas.com

Steven Person is an American politician. A member of the Democratic Party, he is the member-elect for the 77th district of the Arkansas House of Representatives. He was elected in the 2026 election succeeding Democrat Fred Allen who was term limited. Person was a justice of the peace.
