= Michael Mason (politician) =

American politician

Member-elect of the Arkansas House of Representatives from the 79th district
- Assuming office January 2027
- Succeeding: Tara Shephard

Personal details
- Party: Democratic
- Education: University of Arkansas at Pine Bluff; Webster University

Michael Mason is an American politician. A member of the Democratic Party, he is the member-elect for the 79th district of the Arkansas House of Representatives. He was elected in the 2026 election. He was president of the Little Rock School Board.
