= Erika Askeland =

American politician

Member-elect of the Arkansas House of Representatives from the 32nd district
- Assuming office January 2027
- Succeeding: Jack Ladyman

Personal details
- Party: Democratic
- Website: www.erikaforarkansas.com

Erika Askeland is an American politician. A member of the Democratic Party, she is the member-elect for the 32nd district of the Arkansas House of Representatives. She unseated incumbent Republican Jack Ladyman in the 2026 election. She is an early childhood educator by profession.
