= Jeremy Riddle (politician) =

American politician

Member-elect of the Arkansas House of Representatives from the 42nd district
- Assuming office January 2027
- Succeeding: Stephen Meeks

Personal details
- Party: Republican
- Website: riddleforar.com

Jeremy Riddle is an American politician. A member of the Republican Party, he is the member-elect for the 42nd district of the Arkansas House of Representatives. He was elected in the 2026 election. He is a physical therapist and owns an independent pharmacy. He is also a real estate developer and farmer. In 2019, he was named Volunteer of the Year by the Greenbrier Chamber of Commerce.
