= Audrey Willis =

American politician

Member-elect of the Arkansas House of Representatives from the 35th district
- Assuming office January 2027
- Succeeding: Jessie McGruder

Personal details
- Born: Memphis, Tennessee
- Party: Democratic
- Website: Campaign website

Audrey P. Willis is an American politician. A member of the Democratic Party, she is the member-elect for the 35th district of the Arkansas House of Representatives. She was elected at the 2026 election. She works in education. She is the co-founder of CodeCrew, an organization that teaches coding to students.
