= David Miller (preacher) =

American itinerant preacher (1946–2024)

- Born: April 7, 1946; Stringer, Mississippi, United States
- Died: August 7, 2024 (aged 78); Heber Springs, Arkansas, United States
- Occupations: Pastor, preacher, evangelist
- Years active: 1964–2024
- Known for: Trustee of Southern Baptist Theological Seminary
- Spouse: Glenda Emberton (m. 1967, d. 2022)
- Children: Josh Miller

Milton David Miller (April 7, 1946 – August 7, 2024) was an American Baptist pastor, evangelist and itinerant preacher. He was known for his practice of line-by-line expository preaching through the Bible. After working as a local church pastor early in his career, Miller became an itinerant preacher and a teacher of preachers. He also served on the board of Southern Baptist Theological Seminary during the period of the conservative resurgence within the Southern Baptist Convention.

== Early life, education and family ==
Milton David Miller was born in April 7, 1946 in Stringer, Mississippi. Miller was a high school football player until 16, when he was diagnosed with Charcot–Marie–Tooth disease, a rare degenerative muscular atrophy. He moved to Arkansas and attended the State College of Arkansas, Williams Baptist College and Arkansas Tech University. He was married for 55 years to the former Glenda Emberton, who died in 2022. They had one son, Josh Miller, and one grandson.

== Ministry career ==
Early in his pastoral ministry, Miller was pastor of Botkinburg Baptist Church, Rupert Baptist Church and Belleville Baptist Church in Arkansas. He was also director of missions of the Little Red River Baptist Association, based in Heber Springs. In 1995, after 25 years at the Little Red River association, he stepped down and, in partnership with Tumbling Shoals Baptist Church in Heber Springs, started an Expository Preaching Conference. By 2016, the conference had trained more than 1,500 preachers.

While serving on the executive board of the Arkansas Baptist State Convention and as president of the Arkansas State Pastors Conference in the early 1980s, Miller protested the employment of theology professor Dale Moody at Southern Baptist Theological Seminary (SBTS), the Southern Baptist Convention's flagship seminary, over divergent view on the doctrine of apostasy compared to SBTS' governing Abstract of Principles. SBTS President Roy L. Honeycutt ultimately fired Moody in 1982. In 1987, when he and his wife were leading a grassroots effort to amend the Constitution of Arkansas to prohibit abortion to the extent allowed by federal law, Miller recounted that the opposing side brought SBTS ethicist Paul Simmons to appear on Arkansas television, where Simmons—to Miller's shock—described a fetus as "a glob of protoplasm."

Miller was elected a trustee of SBTS in 1988 as a representative of the conservative wing of the denomination. Miller was not a college graduate and had not attended seminary. He introduced himself to his fellow trustees by alluding to his disability: "I had a very lowly beginning in life. I was not only a depraved fellow, I was a deformed fetus. Consequently, I get nervous around Baptist ethics professors who are pro-choice on abortion. If you think I have an agenda as I come to serve on this Board, then I commend you for your discernment!" Contentious elections in 1990 saw the conservative trustees win a majority on the board; the board's first action after this election was a resolution introduced by Miller that declared the board's opposition to abortion except to save the life of the mother.

As an SBTS trustee, Miller voted against granting tenure to faculty who supported ordaining women as pastors and deacons because of his concerns that Southern Baptists would interpret that action as the seminary endorsing the practice. Miller was interviewed in Battle of the Minds, a 1997 TV documentary about the conflict at SBTS. He was featured in the opening segment stating that "I personally think that it has been somewhat deceptive and misleading for Southern Seminary to invite women to come there and receive theological training under the delusion that they are going to be able to serve as pastors in Southern Baptist churches." Miller served on the SBTS board until 1995 and was on the board when the seminary hired Albert Mohler as its president in 1993.

From the late 1990s until his death, Miller conducted a ministry as a traveling expository preacher. He referred to himself as a "country preacher at large".

== Personal life ==
Miller was a quadriplegic due to peroneal muscular atrophy. Diagnosed with the condition around age 16, by his 30s Miller struggled to walk and stand. After he became wheelchair-bound, Miller preached from his wheelchair. Due to the difficulty of holding a Bible or sermon text, Miller memorized lengthy Scripture passages and preached without notes. Miller was an avid deer hunter. His son, Josh, is also a wheelchair user due to a spinal injury in a car accident in 2003.

== Death ==
Miller died on August 7, 2024, of complications from pneumonia and COVID-19. He was remembered by SBTS President Al Mohler as "one of the most stalwart defenders of truth in SBC history".
