= Jim Andrews (politician) =

American politician

Member-elect of the Arkansas House of Representatives from the 97th district
- Assuming office January 11, 2027
- Succeeding: Matthew Shepherd

Personal details
- Party: Republican
- Website: andrewsforarkansas.org

Jim Andrews is an American politician. A member of the Republican Party, he is the member-elect for the 97th district of the Arkansas House of Representatives. He was elected in the 2026 election. He is a former Circuit Court Judge.
