= Stringer, Mississippi =

- Unincorporated community
- Location within Mississippi Location within the United States
- Coordinates: 31°52′01″N 89°15′48″W
- Country: United States
- State: Mississippi
- County: Jasper
- Time zone: UTC-6 (Central (CST))
  - Summer (DST): UTC-5 (CDT)
- ZIP codes: 39481

Stringer is an unincorporated community in southwestern Jasper County, Mississippi, United States. It lies at the intersections of State Highways 15 and County Road 10, just north of Mississippi State Highway 533, between Bay Springs and Laurel. The population was 1,867 at the 2010 census.

== History ==
Stringer was named for John Stringer, who once served as the postmaster. The community was originally known as P.K. prior to changing the name to Stringer. The community is located on the former Gulf, Mobile and Ohio Railroad and was incorporated in 1905 (but disincorporated at a later date). In 1910, the community was home to ten general stores, a saw mill, and drug store. A cotton gin also operated in Stringer.

A post office operated under the name P.K. from 1882 to 1895, and first began operation under the name Stringer in 1895.

== Education ==
Stringer Attendance Center is the local school. It is rated by the Mississippi Department of Education High Performing, and was planned to make Star School in the 2011–2012 school year.

== Notable people ==
- David Miller, itinerant preacher, born in Stringer
- L. C. Ulmer, delta blues singer, born in Stringer
