= Cassandra Mayes =

American politician

Member-elect of the Arkansas House of Representatives from the 71st district
- Assuming office January 2027
- Succeeding: Brandon Achor

Personal details
- Party: Democratic
- Website: www.cassandraforar.com

Cassandra Mayes is an American politician. A member of the Democratic Party, she is the member-elect for the 71st district of the Arkansas House of Representatives. She was elected at the 2026 election. She is the first black woman and first Democrat elected to represent House District 71. She is a retired educator.
