= Jacob Allen =

American politician

Member-elect of the Arkansas House of Representatives from the 10th district
- Assuming office January 2027
- Succeeding: Mindy McAlindon

Personal details
- Party: Democratic
- Website: www.allenforarkansas.com

Jacob Allen is an American politician. A member of the Democratic Party, he is the member-elect for the 10th district of the Arkansas House of Representatives. He is a veteran of the Arkansas Army National Guard.

He is a member of the Chickasaw nation
