= R. J. Hawk =

American politician

Member of the Arkansas House of Representatives from the 81st district
- Incumbent
- Assumed office January 9, 2023

Personal details
- Party: Republican
- Spouse: Brianna
- Education: University of Central Arkansas

R. J. Hawk is an American politician. He serves as a Republican member for the 81st district of the Arkansas House of Representatives.

== Life and career ==
Hawk attended the University of Central Arkansas.

In May 2022, Hawk defeated Walter Burgess in the Republican primary election for the 81st district of the Arkansas House of Representatives. In November 2022, he defeated Roy Vaughn and Greg Sharp in the general election, winning 61 percent of the votes. He assumed office in 2023.
