= Trey Steimel =

American politician

Member of the Arkansas House of Representatives from the 2nd district
- Incumbent
- Assumed office January 9, 2023
- Preceded by: Lane Jean

Personal details
- Party: Republican
- Spouse: Mallory
- Children: 5
- Education: University of Central Arkansas
- Profession: Insurance Agent

Trey Steimel is an American politician who has served as a member of the Arkansas House of Representatives since January 9, 2023. He represents Arkansas' 2nd House district.

== Electoral history ==
He was elected on November 8, 2022, in the 2022 Arkansas House of Representatives election against Libertarian opponent Teresa Norman. He assumed office the next day on January 9, 2023. He was re-elected on January 12, 2025.

== Biography ==
Steimel graduated from Pocahontas High School and University of Central Arkansas. He is a Catholic.

Alabama House of Representatives
| Preceded by Lane Jean | Member of the Arkansas House of Representatives; 2023–present | Succeeded by incumbent |
