= Mindy McAlindon =

American politician

Member of the Arkansas House of Representatives from the 10th district
- Incumbent
- Assumed office January 9, 2023
- Preceded by: Mike Holcomb

Personal details
- Party: Republican
- Spouse: Lance
- Children: 4
- Education: Vanderbilt University (BS); Indiana University Bloomington (MBA)
- Website: https://m.youtube.com/@mindyinthearena

Mindy McAlindon is an American politician who has represented Arkansas' 10th House district as a Republican member of the Arkansas House of Representatives since January 9, 2023.

== Electoral history ==
McAlindon was elected on November 8, 2022, in the 2022 Arkansas House of Representatives election against Democratic opponent Kate Schaffer. She assumed office on January 9, 2023.

== Biography ==
McAlindon is a Christian. She earned a Bachelor of Science in engineering, economics, and mathematics in 1989 from Vanderbilt University, followed by a Master of Business Administration from Indiana University Bloomington in 1993.

McAlindon also serves as a committeewoman to the Republican National Committee where she serves on the budget committee.

== See also ==
- Political parties in the United States

Arkansas House of Representatives
| Preceded by Mike Holcomb | Member of the Arkansas House of Representatives; 2023–present | Succeeded by incumbent |
