= Lincoln Barnett (politician) =

American politician

Member of the Arkansas House of Representatives from the 63rd district
- Incumbent
- Assumed office January 13, 2025
- Succeeded by: Deborah Ferguson

Personal details
- Born: February 8, 1989 (age 37) Jonesboro, Arkansas
- Party: Democratic
- Education: Arkansas School for Mathematics, Sciences, and the Arts; Morehouse College; Memphis Theological Seminary (M.Div)

Lincoln Barnett (born February 8, 1989) is an American politician. He was elected member of the Arkansas House of Representatives for the 63rd district in 2024.

Barnett was mayor of Hughes, Arkansas. He is an ordained Baptist minister.
