= Paul Childress (politician) =

American politician

Member of the Arkansas House of Representatives from the 83rd district
- Incumbent
- Assumed office January 13, 2025
- Succeeded by: Lanny Fite

Personal details
- Party: Republican

Paul Childress is an American politician who was elected member of the Arkansas House of Representatives for the 83rd district in 2024.

Childress was president of the Benton School Board.
