= Scott Richardson (politician) =

American politician

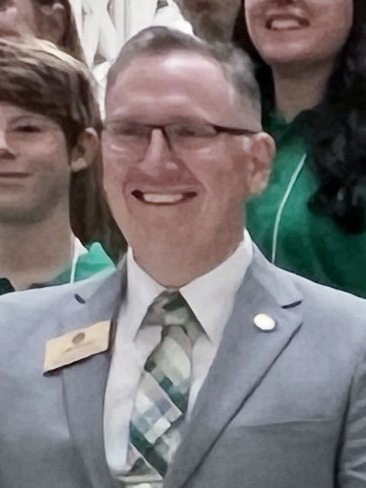
- Richardson in 2023

Member of the Arkansas House of Representatives from the 13th district
- Incumbent
- Assumed office 2018
- Preceded by: David Hillman

Personal details
- Party: Republican
- Education: bachelor's degree in computer and information sciences, master's degree in information technology
- Alma mater: Arkansas Tech University

Scott Richardson is an American politician who has served as a member of the Arkansas House of Representatives since January 9, 2023. He represents Arkansas's 13th House district.

== Electoral history ==
He was elected in 2018 unopposed. He lost reelection in 2020, and won reelection in 2022.

== Biography ==
Richardson is a Baptist. He served in the United States Army from 1989 to 1998, during the Gulf War. He graduated from Atkins High School. He earned a bachelor's degree in computer and information sciences in 2004, and a master's degree in information technology from Arkansas Tech University in 2006. He is a member of the American Legion.

Arkansas House of Representatives
Preceded by David Hillman	Member of the Arkansas House of Representatives; 2018–present	Succeeded by incumbent
