= David Tollett =

American politician

David Tollett is a school superintendent and Republican state legislator in Arkansas. He serves in the Arkansas House of Representatives. He represents District 12.

His opponent, Jimmie Wilson, won 52 percent of the votes but was determined ineligible because of a state law precluding candidates convicted of past crimes involving deceit. His opponent had been pardoned by Bill Clinton in regard to the financial issues that occurred some 30 years earlier but the Arkansas Supreme Court ruled unanimously that he was ineligible to run for office.
