= Matthew Brown (Arkansas politician) =

American politician

Member of the Arkansas House of Representatives from the 55th district
- Incumbent
- Assumed office January 9, 2023
- Preceded by: Monte Hodges

Personal details
- Party: Republican
- Spouse: Ashlea
- Children: 2
- Education: Arkansas School for Mathematics, Sciences, and the Arts; Hendrix College (BA); University of Arkansas at Little Rock (JD)
- Profession: Lawyer

Matthew Brown is an American politician who has served as a member of the Arkansas House of Representatives since January 9, 2023. He represents Arkansas' 55th House district. He is also Faulkner County Justice of the Peace since 2020.

== Electoral history ==
He was elected on November 8, 2022, in the 2022 Arkansas House of Representatives election against Democratic opponent Dee Sanders. He assumed office on January 9, 2023.

== Biography ==
Brown earned a degree from Hendrix College in 2004 and a Juris Doctor degree from the University of Arkansas at Little Rock in 2007.

Arkansas House of Representatives
Preceded by Monte Hodges	Member of the Arkansas House of Representatives; 2023–present	Succeeded by incumbent
