= Steve Unger =

American politician and military officer

Member of the Arkansas House of Representatives from the 19th district
- Incumbent
- Assumed office January 9, 2023
- Preceded by: Justin Gonzales

Personal details
- Born: May 22, 1958 (age 68) Springdale, Arkansas, U.S.
- Party: Republican
- Spouse: Lynette Unger
- Children: Andy Unger; Thomas Unger (deceased)
- Education: University of Arkansas; Midwestern Baptist Theological Seminary; Marine Corps Command and Staff College

Military service
- Branch/service: United States Navy
- Rank: Captain

Steve Unger is an American politician and former military officer who has served as a Republican member of the Arkansas House of Representatives from the 19th district since 2023. He previously served 32 years in the Navy, reaching the rank of captain.

== Biography ==
Unger was born and raised in Springdale in northwestern Arkansas. He received a bachelor's degree in business administration from the University of Arkansas in 1981, a Master of Divinity degree from Midwestern Baptist Theological Seminary in 1990, and a master's degree in military science from the Marine Corps Command and Staff College in 2002.

After 32 years of active-duty military service with the Navy, Unger retired with the rank of captain. In 2022, Unger won election to the Arkansas House of Representatives to represent the 19th district.
