= Don Edward Glover =

American politician from Arkansas

Don Glover

Member of the Arkansas House of Representatives from the 11th district
- In office January 14, 2019 – December 2020
- Preceded by: Mark McElroy
- Succeeded by: Mark McElroy

Personal details
- Born: April 1944 (age 82)
- Party: Democratic
- Occupation: Lawyer, judge

Don Edward Glover (born April 1944) is an American politician who was a member of the Arkansas House of Representatives from the 11th district in Chicot County.

== Political career ==
=== Election ===
Glover was elected in the general election on November 6, 2018, winning 44 percent of the vote over 31 percent of Independent candidate Mark McElroy.
