= Ron McNair (politician) =

American politician

Member of the Arkansas House of Representatives from the 5th district
- Incumbent
- Assumed office 2015
- Preceded by: David Fieldings
- Succeeded by: Mike Bishop (elect)

Personal details
- Party: Republican
- Profession: Automotive Repair

Ron McNair is an American Republican politician serving the 5th district in the Arkansas House of Representatives. He was elected in the 2022 election on November 8, 2022, against Independent opponent Jim Hall. He assumed office on January 9, 2023. This is his fifth time serving on the house.

== Committees ==
He currently serves on six committees. The committee on Agriculture, Forestry & Economic Development, the subcommittee on Agriculture- House Agriculture, Forestry & Natural Resources, the Arkansas Legislative Committee, the Education Committee, the subcommittee K-12, Vocational-Technical Institutions, and the Joint Committee on Energy.
