= Talesha Dokes =

American politician

Member-elect of the Arkansas House of Representatives from the 72nd district
- Assuming office January 2027
- Succeeding: Tracy Steele

Personal details
- Party: Democratic
- Education: Michigan State University
- Website: votedrdokes.com

Talesha Dokes is an American politician. A member of the Democratic Party, she is the member-elect for the 72nd district of the Arkansas House of Representatives. She was elected at the 2026 election. She is based in North Little Rock, Arkansas. She was the first African American woman to earn a doctorate degree in fisheries and wildlife from Michigan State University.
