= Dolly Henley =

American politician

Member of the Arkansas House of Representatives from the 88th district
- Incumbent
- Assumed office January 13, 2025
- Succeeded by: Danny Watson

Personal details
- Party: Republican

Dolly Henley is an American politician who was elected member of the Arkansas House of Representatives for the 88th district in 2024.

She was born and raised in Prescott, Arkansas.
