= Taleshan =

Taleshan طالشان
- Neighborhood
- Location within Iran
- Coordinates: 37°14′38″N 49°34′55″E
- Country: Iran
- Province: Gilan
- County: Rasht
- Bakhsh: Central
- City: Rasht

Population (2006)
  - Total: 7,521
- Time zone: UTC+3:30 (IRST)

Taleshan (Persian: طالشان, also Romanized as Ţāleshān) is a neighborhood in the city of Rasht, formerly a village in Lakan Rural District, in the Central District of Rasht County, Gilan Province, Iran. At the 2006 census, its population was 7,521, in 2,216 families.

Taleshan became part of the urban area of Rasht.
