= Alyssa Brown (politician) =

American politician (born 1997)

Member of the Arkansas House of Representatives from the 41st district
- Incumbent
- Assumed office January 13, 2025
- Preceded by: Josh Miller

Personal details
- Born: 1997 (age 28–29)
- Party: Republican

Alyssa Brown (born 1997) is an American politician who was elected member of the Arkansas House of Representatives for the 41st district in 2024. She is a member of the Republican Party and the owner of an online clothing boutique.
