= Brent Montgomery (politician) =

American politician

Member-elect of the Arkansas House of Representatives from the 52nd district
- Assuming office January 2027
- Succeeding: Marcus Richmond

Personal details
- Party: Republican

Brent Montgomery is an American politician. A member of the Republican Party, he is the member-elect for the 52nd district of the Arkansas House of Representatives.
