= Tonya Fletcher =

American politician

Member-elect of the Arkansas House of Representatives from the 46th district
- Assuming office January 2027
- Succeeding: Jon S. Eubanks

Personal details
- Party: Republican

Tonya Fletcher is an American politician. A member of the Republican Party, she is the member-elect for the 46th district of the Arkansas House of Representatives.
