= Tara Shephard =

American politician

Member of the Arkansas House of Representatives from the 79th district
- Incumbent
- Assumed office January 3, 2023
- Preceded by: Gary Deffenbaugh

Personal details
- Party: Democratic
- Education: University of Arkansas at Pine Bluff (BA); University of Arkansas at Little Rock (MA)

Tara Shephard is an American politician serving as a member of the Arkansas House of Representatives for the 79th district. Elected in November 2022, she assumed office on January 9, 2023.

== Education ==
Shephard earned a Bachelor of Arts degree in criminal justice from the University of Arkansas at Pine Bluff in 1998 and a Master of Arts in criminal justice and corrections from the University of Arkansas at Little Rock in 2000.

== Career ==
Prior to entering politics, Shephard worked as a teacher and substance abuse counselor. She served as a board member of the Little Rock School District from 2013 to 2015. Shephard was elected to the Arkansas House of Representatives in November 2022.
