= Gary Deffenbaugh =

American politician

Member of the Arkansas House of Representatives
- In office January 14, 2013 – January 3, 2023
- Succeeded by: Tara Shephard
- Constituency: 79th district
- In office January 2011 – January 14, 2013
- Constituency: 66th district

Personal details
- Born: April 25, 1949 (age 77)
- Party: Republican
- Education: Ouachita Baptist University (BS)

Gary Edwin Deffenbaugh (born April 25, 1949) is an American politician who served as a member of the Arkansas House of Representatives from 2011 to 2023.

== Education and career ==
Deffenbaugh has a Bachelor of Science in education from Ouachita Baptist University. He is a retired teacher and coach.

== Arkansas House of Representatives ==
Deffenbaugh won the primary election for the 66th district of the Arkansas House of Representatives on May 16, 2010, winning 1,426 votes to 719 against Kevin R. Holmes. Deffenbaugh won the general election for the 66th district on November 2, 2010, winning 5,113 votes to 1,851 against Diana K. Faucher.

=== 88th Arkansas General Assembly (2011–2012) ===
Deffenbaugh began serving as a representative in January 2011. During the 88th Assembly, Deffenbaugh served on the following committees:

- Aging, Children and Youth, Legislative and Military Affairs
- Judiciary
- Public Retirement and Social Security Programs

Beginning with the 2012 election, Deffenbaugh was redistricted from the 66th district to the 79th district in the Arkansas House of Representatives. The new districts would go into effect starting with the 89th Assembly.

Deffenbaugh was unopposed in the 2012 election for the 79th district of the Arkansas House of Representatives.

=== 89th Arkansas General Assembly (2013–2014) ===
Deffenbaugh was officially redistricted from the 66th district to the 79th district on January 14, 2013, the first day of the 89th Assembly. During the 89th Assembly, Deffenbaugh served on the following committees:

- Public Retirement and Social Security Programs
- Education
- Aging, Children and Youth, Legislative and Military Affairs
- Legislative Joint Auditing

Deffenbaugh was unopposed in the 2014 election for 79th district of the Arkansas House of Representatives.

=== 90th Arkansas General Assembly (2015–2016) ===
During the 90th Assembly, Deffenbaugh served on the following committees:

- City, County and Local Affairs
- Education
- Legislative Council
- Public Retirement and Social Security Programs, Vice chair

Deffenbaugh was unopposed in the 2016 election for the 79th district of the Arkansas House of Representatives.

=== 91st Arkansas General Assembly (2017–2018) ===
During the 91st Assembly, Deffenbaugh served on the following committees:

- City, County and Local Affairs
- Education
- Public Retirement and Social Security Programs, Vice chair

Deffenbaugh was unopposed in the 2018 election for the 79th district of the Arkansas House of Representatives.

=== 92nd Arkansas General Assembly (2019–2020) ===
During the 92nd Assembly, Deffenbaugh served on the following committees:

- Legislative Council
- Public Retirement and Social Security Programs Committee, Vice-Chair
- House City, County and Local Affairs Committee
- House Education Committee

Deffenbaugh was unopposed in the 2020 election for the 79th district of the Arkansas House of Representatives.

=== 93rd Arkansas General Assembly (2021–2022) ===
During the 93rd Assembly, Deffenbaugh served on the following committees:

- House Education Committee
- House State Agencies and Governmental Affairs Committee
- Legislative Council
- Public Retirement and Social Security Programs Committee, Vice-chair

On January 13, 2022, Deffenbaugh announced he would not be seeking re-election.

== Personal life ==
Deffenbaugh resides in Van Buren, Arkansas. He is a Southern Baptist. He is married and has two adult children.
