= Ashley Hudson =

American politician

Member of the Arkansas House of Representatives from the 75th district
- Incumbent
- Assumed office January 11, 2021
- Preceded by: Jim Sorvillo

Personal details
- Born: Little Rock, Arkansas, U.S.
- Party: Democratic
- Spouse: Cliff
- Children: 4
- Education: Vanderbilt University (BA); University of Arkansas (MA); University of Arkansas School of Law (JD)
- Occupation: Attorney

Ashley Hudson is a state representative in Arkansas. She was elected to the Arkansas House of Representatives in 2020 and represents part of Pulaski County, Arkansas.

== Electoral history ==
Year	Office	District	Democratic		Republican		Libertarian	
2020	Arkansas House of Representatives	House District 32	Ashley Hudson	50.1%	Jim Sorvillo (incumbent)	49.9%		
2022	Arkansas House of Representatives	House District 75	Ashley Hudson (incumbent)	54.8%	Heather Beach-Turchi	45.2%		
2024	Arkansas House of Representatives	House District 75	Ashley Hudson (incumbent)	64.9%			Michael White	35.1%
