= Keith Brooks (American politician) =

American politician

Member of the Arkansas House of Representatives from the 31st district
- Incumbent
- Assumed office January 11, 2021
- Preceded by: Andy Davis

Personal details
- Party: Republican
- Spouse: Jenny Brooks
- Children: 3
- Education: Harding University (MBA)

Keith Brooks is an American politician serving as a member of the Arkansas House of Representatives from the 31st district. Elected in November 2020, he assumed office on January 11, 2021.

== Career ==
From 2000 to 2002, Brooks worked as a business sales representative for Dell. He later worked as a territory sales representative for Cardinal Health. From 2004 to 2011, he was a territory manager for DJO Global. He was an account executive at Celleration before becoming an insurance agent. He was elected to the Arkansas House of Representatives in November 2020 and assumed office on January 11, 2021.
