= Diana Gonzales Worthen =

American politician from Arkansas

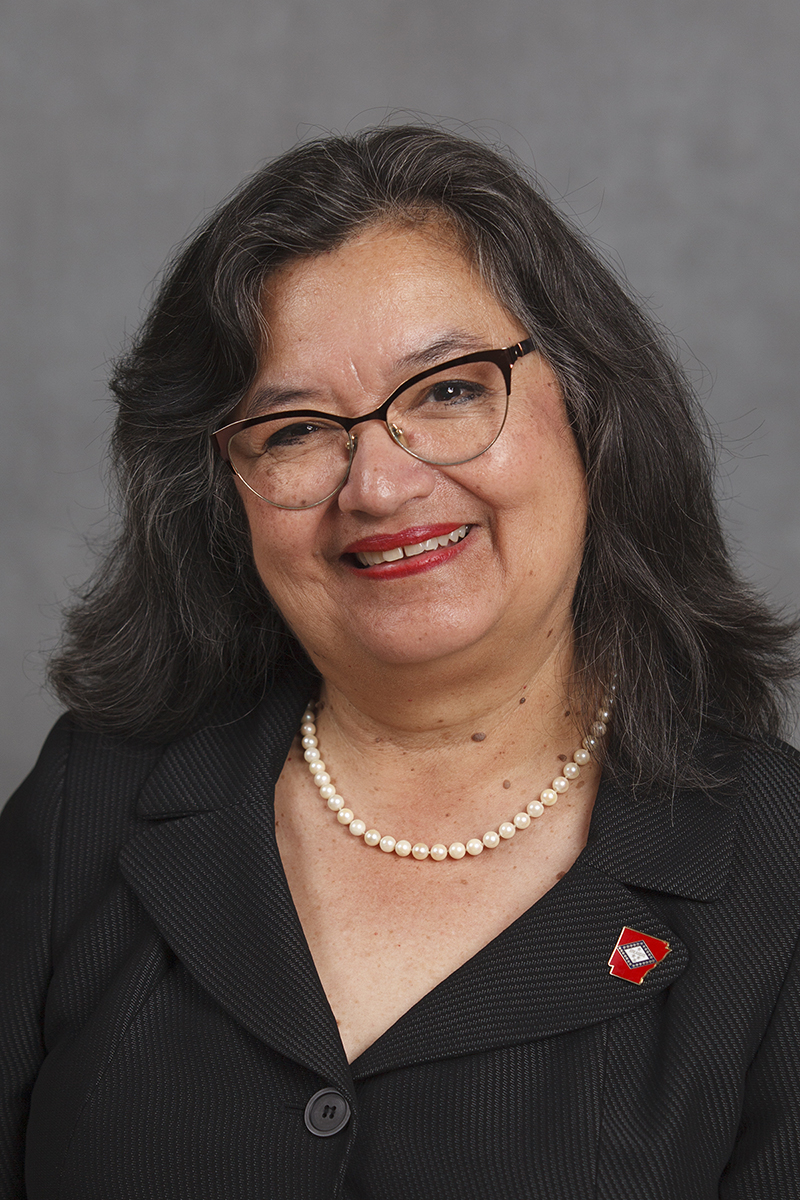

Member of the Arkansas House of Representatives from the 9th district
- Incumbent
- Assumed office January 13, 2025
- Preceded by: DeAnna Hodges

Personal details
- Party: Democratic
- Website: www.dianaforarkansas.com

Diana Gonzales Worthen is an American former teacher and politician from Arkansas. In 2024, she was elected to represent the 9th district in the Arkansas House of Representatives, which contains part of Springdale. She is a Democrat.

== Personal life ==
Gonzales Worthen's grandparents immigrated from Mexico. She is the first Latina elected to the Arkansas House of Representatives. She is Catholic.

== Education ==
She graduated from Blinn Jr. College, University of Texas at Dallas, University of Houston, and the University of Arkansas.

== Family ==
She lives in Springdale with her husband. They have an adult daughter.
