= Kendon Underwood =

American politician

Member of the Arkansas House of Representatives from the 16th district
- Incumbent
- Assumed office January 11, 2021
- Preceded by: Jana Della Rosa

Personal details
- Born: Arkansas, U.S.
- Party: Republican
- Education: University of Arkansas (BA, JD)

Kendon R. Underwood is an American attorney and politician serving as a member of the Arkansas House of Representatives from the 16th district. Elected in November 2020, he assumed office on January 11, 2021.

== Early life and education ==
Underwood was born and raised in Arkansas. He earned a Bachelor of Arts degree from the University of Arkansas and a Juris Doctor from the University of Arkansas School of Law.

== Career ==
In 2014, Underwood served as a judicial extern for the Arkansas 19th Judicial Circuit West. In 2015 and 2016, he was an attorney at the Slinkard Law Firm in Rogers, Arkansas. From 2016 to 2018, he was an associate attorney at the Woodard Law Group in Bentonville, Arkansas. Since 2018, he has worked as corporate counsel at J. B. Hunt. Underwood was elected to the Arkansas House of Representatives in November 2020 and assumed office on January 11, 2021.

== Personal life ==
Underwood lives in Cave Springs, Arkansas.
