= Stephen Meeks =

American politician

Member of the Arkansas House of Representatives from the 42nd district
- Incumbent
- Assumed office January 2011
- Preceded by: Eddie Hawkins

Personal details
- Born: October 30, 1970 (age 56)
- Party: Republican
- Education: Florida Community College

Stephen Meeks (born October 30, 1970) is an American politician serving as a member of the Arkansas House of Representatives from the 42nd district in Faulkner County since 2011.

== Political career ==
=== Election ===
Meeks was elected in the general election on November 2, 2010, winning 55 percent of the vote over 45 percent for Democratic candidate Eddie Hawkins. He represented the 47th district. Meeks was reelected in 2012 with 73% of the vote, representing the 67th district. He ran unopposed in 2014 and 2016. He was reelected in 2018 with 79% of the vote, and in 2020 with 75% of the vote.

== Personal life ==
As of 2017, Meeks delivered pizza for Papa John's Pizza.
