= Richard Womack =

American politician

William Richard Womack

Member of the Arkansas House of Representatives from the 18th district
- Incumbent
- Assumed office January 2013
- Preceded by: Toni Bradford

Personal details
- Born: 1974 (age 51–52)
- Party: Republican
- Education: Ouachita Baptist University
- Occupation: Businessman

William Richard Womack (born 1974) is a businessman from Arkadelphia, Arkansas, who is a Republican member of the Arkansas House of Representatives. His District 18 includes portions of Clark, Dallas, Hot Spring, and Garland counties. He was initially elected in 2012 and re-elected in 2014.

In 1993, Womack graduated from Benton High School in Benton in Saline County. He then attended Ouachita Baptist University in Arkadelphia, from which he graduated in 1997. Self-employed in the paint and construction business, he is a married father of seven children.

On November 6, 2012, Womack defeated Democrat Fred W. Harris of Arkadelphia. Womack received 5,865 votes (52.8 percent) to Harris' 5,247 (47.2 percent).

In his campaign Womack was endorsed by Huck PAC, former Governor Mike Huckabee's political action committee.

Womack serves on the House Public Health and City, County & Local committees. In January 2013, Womack proposed House Resolution 1003 to encourage all branches of federal, state and local governments to respect and preserve gun rights and oppose any action that would "abridge, infringe upon, or limit the right to keep and bear arms."

Preceded by Toni Bradford	Arkansas State Representative for District 18 (Clark, Dallas, Hot Spring, and Garland counties); 2013–	Succeeded by Incumbent
