= Dwight Tosh =

American politician

Member of the Arkansas House of Representatives from the 52nd district
- Incumbent
- Assumed office January 2015
- Preceded by: John Hutchison

Personal details
- Born: Dwight Crandall Tosh; November 12, 1948 (age 77)
- Party: Republican
- Spouse: Joan Tosh
- Children: 2
- Education: Northwestern University (attended); University of Louisville (attended); Arkansas State University (BA)

Dwight Crandall Tosh (born November 12, 1948) is a retired trooper of the Arkansas State Police from Jonesboro, Arkansas, who is a Republican member of the Arkansas House of Representatives for District 52 in Craighead, Poinsett, Jackson, and Independence counties in the northeastern portion of his state.

== Biography ==
Tosh and his wife, Joan, have two children. He is a non-denominational Christian. He formerly resided in Newport, Forrest City, and Bentonville, Arkansas. In 1962, at the age of 13, Tosh was diagnosed with Hodgkin lymphoma. He received treatment at St. Jude Children's Research Hospital in Memphis, Tennessee, where he was the hospital's seventeenth patient.
