= Mark McElroy (Arkansas politician) =

American politician from Arkansas

Member of the Arkansas House of Representatives from the 11th district
- Incumbent
- Assumed office January 2021
- Preceded by: Don Glover
- In office January 2013 – December 2018
- Preceded by: Efrem Elliott
- Succeeded by: Don Glover

Personal details
- Party: Republican; Democratic (formerly)
- Occupation: Judge, farmer, auctioneer

Mark D. McElroy is an American politician who is a member of the Arkansas House of Representatives from the 11th district.
