= John P. Carr =

American politician

Member of the Arkansas House of Representatives from the 15th district
- Incumbent
- Assumed office January 11, 2021
- Preceded by: Rebecca Petty

Personal details
- Party: Republican
- Education: Bachelor of Science in computer science at University of Missouri; Master of Business Administration at University of Arkansas

John Paul Carr is an American politician serving in the Arkansas House of Representatives.

== Arkansas House of Representatives ==
Carr faced Adrienne Woods in the 2020 Arkansas House 94th District Republican Primary. Carr won the primary against AWoods, 1,019 votes to 938. Carr defeated Jene Huffman-Gilreath in the general election, 5,654 votes to 4,681.

=== 93rd Arkansas General Assembly ===
Carr began serving as a Representative on January 11, 2021. During the 93rd Assembly, Carr served on the following committees:

- House City, County and Local Affairs Committee
- Public Transportation Committee
- Advanced Communications and Information Technology Committee

== Personal life ==
Carr resides in Rogers, Arkansas. Carr is a Christian.
