= Les Eaves =

American politician

Member of the Arkansas House of Representatives from the 46th district
- In office January 12, 2015 – January 9, 2023
- Preceded by: Mark Biviano

Member of the Arkansas House of Representatives from the 58th district
- Incumbent
- Assumed office January 9, 2023

Personal details
- Born: Leslie Dale Eaves
- Party: Republican
- Education: Colorado State University

Leslie Dale Eaves is an American politician. He serves as a Republican member for the 58th district of the Arkansas House of Representatives.

Eaves attended the Colorado State University, where he earned his degree in business administration. He also attended at the University of Texas at Arlington. Eaves worked as a real estate agent. He served as the vice president of the Delta Manufacturing, Inc.

In 2014, Eaves was elected to represent the 46th district of the Arkansas House of Representatives, succeeding Mark Biviano. Eaves took office on January 12, 2015.

As of 2022, Eaves is a candidate for the 58th district of the Arkansas House of Representatives. He tested positive for the COVID-19.
