= Roger D. Lynch =

American politician

Roger Lynch

Member of the Arkansas House of Representatives from the 14th district
- Incumbent
- Assumed office January 2017
- Preceded by: Camille Bennett

Personal details
- Party: Republican
- Spouse: Sheila
- Children: 4
- Education: University of Arkansas (BS, MS)

Roger D. Lynch is an American businessman and politician serving as a member of the Arkansas House of Representatives from the 14th district. He assumed office in 2017.

== Early life and education ==
Lynch is a native of Lonoke, Arkansas. He earned a Bachelor of Science degree and Master of Science in operations management from the University of Arkansas.

== Career ==
From 2001 to 2014, Lynch worked as a plant operations manager at the Remington Outdoor Company. He was elected to the Arkansas House of Representatives in November 2016 and assumed office in January 2017. Since 2014, Lynch has owned and operated Lynch HVACR LLC.
