= Justin Gonzales =

American politician

Member of the Arkansas House of Representatives
- Incumbent
- Assumed office January 2015
- Preceded by: Nate Steel
- Constituency: 19th district (2015–2023); 89th district (2023–present)

Personal details
- Born: c. 1982 (age c. 43)
- Party: Republican
- Spouse: Cassie
- Children: 2
- Occupation: Forester

Justin Rory Gonzales (born c. 1982) is an American politician who is a Republican member of the Arkansas House of Representatives from the 89th district. He previously represented the 19th district.

== Career ==
In 2014, he was elected to succeed Democrat Nate Steel, who ran unsuccessfully for state attorney general against Leslie Rutledge in a general Republican sweep of Arkansas elections. In his first term in office, Gonzales sits on the committees of (1) Revenue and Taxation, (2) County, City and Local Affairs, and (3) the Joint Committee on Advanced Communication and Information Technology.

Gonzales graduated around 2000 from Gurdon High School in Gurdon in Clark County. He is a member of the board of his local Church of God denomination and is president of youth baseball and softball teams in Gurdon. He serves on the Okolona Volunteer Fire Department. He and his wife, Cassie, have two children.

In February 2015, Gonzales joined dozens of his fellow Republicans and two Democrats in co-sponsoring legislation submitted by Representative Lane Jean of Magnolia, to reduce unemployment compensation benefits. The measure was promptly signed into law by Republican Governor Asa Hutchinson.

Preceded by Nate Steel	Member of the Arkansas House of Representatives; January 2015 – present	Succeeded by Incumbent
