= Mike Holcomb (politician) =

American politician

Member of the Arkansas House of Representatives
- Incumbent
- Assumed office January 1, 2013
- Preceded by: Sheilla Lampkin
- Constituency: 10th district (2013–2023); 93rd district (2023–present)

Personal details
- Party: Republican (since 2015)
- Other political affiliations: Democratic (until 2015)
- Education: Southern Baptist College

Mike Holcomb is an American politician who has served as a member of the Arkansas House of Representatives since 2013. He represented the 10th district until being redistricted to the 93rd district in 2023. Initially a Democrat, on August 20, 2015, he announced the decision to join the Republican Party.

== Education ==
Holcomb graduated from Southern Baptist College.

== Elections ==
- 2012 With Representative Sheilla Lampkin redistricted to District 9, Holcomb placed first in the three-way May 22, 2012 Democratic Primary with 1,814 votes (41.1%) won the June 22 runoff election with 1,649 votes (52.9%), and won the November 6, 2012 General election with 5,813 votes (55.3%) against Republican nominee Charles Roberts.
