= Jack Ladyman =

American mechanical engineer and politician

Member of the Arkansas House of Representatives from the 59th district
- Incumbent
- Assumed office January 12, 2015
- Preceded by: Butch Wilkins

Personal details
- Party: Republican
- Spouse: Linda Ladyman
- Children: 3
- Education: Williams Baptist University; University of Arkansas
- Occupation: Mechanical engineer

Jack Ladyman is an American mechanical engineer and politician. He served as a Republican member for the 59th district of the Arkansas House of Representatives.

Ladyman attended Williams Baptist University, where he earned an associate degree. He then attended the University of Arkansas where he earned a Bachelor of Science degree in Mechanical engineering. In 2015, Ladyman won the election for the 59th district of the Arkansas House of Representatives, in which he was against Ron Carroll. He succeeded Butch Wilkins. Ladyman assumed his office on January 12, 2015. In May 2022, he was nominated as candidate for the 32nd district.
