= Fred Allen (Arkansas politician) =

American politician

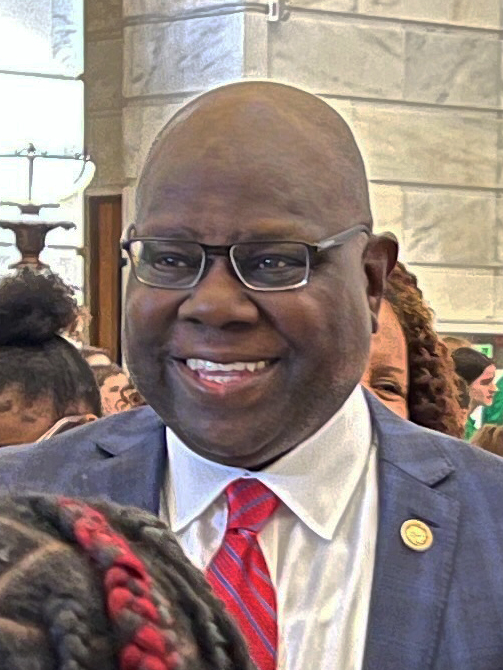
- Allen in 2023

Arkansas House of Representatives
- Incumbent
- Assumed office 2006

Personal details
- Born: June 14, 1953 (age 73) Little Rock, Arkansas, USA
- Party: Democratic
- Education: Middle Tennessee State University

Fred Allen (born June 14, 1953) is a member of the Arkansas House of Representatives, having served consecutively since 2006.

== Biography ==
Allen played basketball as the first Black full-time starter and first regular sophomore starter during his time at Little Rock Central High School. Upon graduation, he was surprised to find that he had no scholarship offers to play basketball in college. Ten years later, he discovered that recruitment letters had unknowingly been withheld from him in a time when NCAA prohibited schools from contacting recruits directly. He had received offers from Oral Roberts University, University of Missouri, University of Virginia, Pepperdine University, Louisiana State University, and Rice University.

Allen received a degree in business administration from Middle Tennessee State University and served as an administrative aide in the office of U.S. Senator David Pryor. Allen was first elected to the state legislature in 2006, representing District 33, in Little Rock, Arkansas, and drew the best number for assigned seniority among new members. In 2011, Allen filed a bill to develop an insurance exchange in the state, but pulled it after a compromise bill was reached with Republicans. In 2017, Allen filed a bill in the Arkansas House to raise the minimum age for purchasing tobacco products to 21.

== Personal life ==
Allen was diagnosed with prostate cancer in 2007.
