= 92nd Arkansas General Assembly =

Term of state legislature in Arkansas, US

←	91st	93rd	→
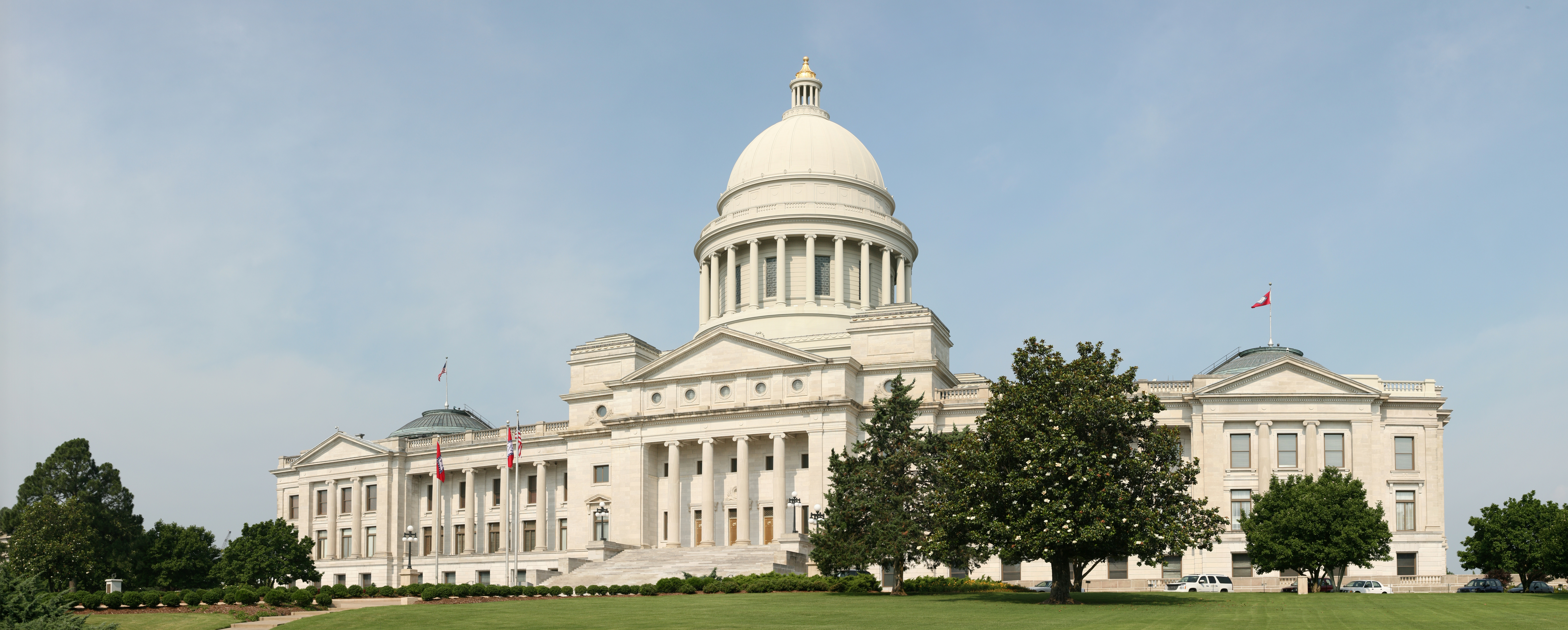
- Arkansas State Capitol (2009)

Overview
- Meeting place: Arkansas State Capitol; Jack Stephens Center (House, special session)
- Term: January 14, 2019 –
- Website: https://www.arkleg.state.ar.us/

Arkansas Senate
- Senate party standings
- Members: 35 (26 R, 9 D)
- President of the Senate: Tim Griffin (R)
- President Pro Tempore of the Senate: Jim Hendren (R)
- Majority Leader: Bart Hester (R)
- Minority Leader: Keith Ingram (D)
- Party control: Republican Party

House of Representatives
- House party standings
- Members: 100 (76 R, 24 D)
- House Speaker: Matthew Shepherd (R)
- Speaker pro Tempore: Jon Eubanks (R)
- Majority Leader: Marcus Richmond (R)
- Minority Leader: Fredrick Love (D)
- Party control: Republican Party

Sessions
- 1st: January 14, 2019 – April 24, 2019
- 2nd: March 26, 2020 – March 28, 2020
- 3rd: April 8, 2020 – April 24, 2020

The Ninety-Second Arkansas General Assembly is the legislative body of the state of Arkansas in 2019 and 2020. In this General Assembly, the Arkansas Senate and Arkansas House of Representatives were both controlled by the Republicans. In the Senate, 26 senators were Republicans and 9 were Democrats. In the House, 76 representatives were Republicans, 24 were Democrats. A special session was called in March 2020 to address the COVID-19 pandemic.

== Sessions ==
- The Regular Session of the 92nd General Assembly opened on January 14, 2019. It adjourned sine die on April 24, 2019.
- Governor Asa Hutchinson called for a special session to begin March 26, 2020 to address the COVID-19 pandemic. Due to social distancing recommendations, the 35 senators met in the 100-seat House chamber, and the House met in the Jack Stephens Center basketball arena on the University of Arkansas at Little Rock campus.
- The Fiscal Session began April 8, 2020 and concluded April 24.

== Major events ==
=== Vacancies ===
- Representative John Walker (D-34th) died on October 28, 2019. The Democratic primary to fill the seat was held January 14, resulting in a runoff between Joy Springer and Ryan Davis. The runoff appeared to end in a tie until a ballot arrived from Sweden, giving Springer the one-vote win. She defeated independent candidate Roderick Talley on March 3 and was sworn March 18, 2020 to fill the seat for the remainder of the term.
- Representative Mickey Gates (R-22nd) made national news in 2018 for failing to pay taxes for 15 years, but had resisted calls for his resignation. The House voted to expel Gates in October 2019, leaving his seat vacant until a special election. Richard McGrew (R) won a special election on March 3 to fill the seat for remainder of the term. He was sworn in on March 18, 2020.

== Legislative summary ==
The legislature was prolific during the regular session, considering 684 Senate bills and 986 House bills. A total of 1,091 bills become law; Governor Asa Hutchinson did not veto any bills.

- The governor's priority, state government reorganization, merged state agencies from 42 to 15 under the Transformation and Efficiency Act of 2019.
- Act 182 cuts Arkansas's top individual income tax rate from 6.9 percent to 5.9 percent over two years.

In the special session, both chambers unanimously sent identical COVID-19 relief-related bills enabling the creation of a $173 million COVID-19 Rainy Day Fund from previously unallocated reserves. By the start of the fiscal session, three lawmakers had tested positive for COVID-19. A short fiscal session met to pass an annual budget, revised lower due to lower revenue forecasts, and reauthorized Arkansas Works, Arkansas's Medicaid expansion. Lawmakers and staff were provided with cloth masks sewed by friends and family of Rep. Robin Lundstrum (R-87th).

Lawmakers produced a $5.89 billion general revenue budget in the fiscal session by votes of 35-0 and 98-0 and sent it to the governor on April 16.

== Senate ==
=== Leadership ===
==== Officers ====
Office	Officer	Party	District
President/Lieutenant Governor	Tim Griffin	Republican	
President Pro Tempore of the Senate	Jim Hendren	Republican	2
Assistant Presidents pro tempore	John Cooper	Republican	21
Assistant Presidents pro tempore	Kim Hammer	Republican	33
Assistant Presidents pro tempore	Mathew Pitsch	Republican	8
Assistant Presidents pro tempore	Stephanie Flowers	Democratic	25

==== Floor Leaders ====
Office	Officer	Party	District
Majority Leader	Bart Hester	Republican	1
Majority Whip	Scott Flippo	Republican	17
Minority Leader	Keith Ingram	Democratic	24
Minority Whip	Will Bond	Democratic	32

Source: Arkansas Senate

=== Senators ===
District	Name	Party	Residence	First elected	Seat up	Term-limited
1	Bart Hester	Rep	Cave Springs	2012	2020	2028
2	Jim Hendren	Rep	Gravette	2012	2020	2028
3	Cecile Bledsoe	Rep	Rogers	2008	2020	2020
4	Greg Leding	Dem	Fayetteville	2018	2020	
5	Bob Ballinger	Rep	Berryville	2018	2020	
6	Gary Stubblefield	Rep	Branch	2012	2020	2028
7	Lance Eads	Rep	Springdale	2016	2020	2032
8	Mathew Pitsch	Rep	Fort Smith	2018	2020	
9	Terry Rice	Rep	Waldron	2014	2020	2024
10	Larry Teague	Dem	Nashville	2008	2020	2020
11	Jimmy Hickey Jr.	Rep	Texarkana	2012	2020	2028
12	Bruce Maloch	Dem	Magnolia	2012	2020	2028
13	Alan Clark	Rep	Lonsdale	2012	2020	2028
14	Bill Sample	Rep	Hot Springs	2010	2020	2020
15	Mark Johnson	Rep	Little Rock	2018	2020	
16	Breanne Davis	Rep	Russellville	2018 (special)	2020	
17	Scott Flippo	Rep	Mountain Home	2014	2020	2030
18	Missy Irvin	Rep	Mountain View	2010	2020	2026
19	James Sturch	Rep	Batesville	2018	2020	
20	Blake Johnson	Rep	Corning	2014	2020	2030
21	John Cooper	Rep	Jonesboro	2014 (special)	2020	2032
22	Dave Wallace	Rep	Leachville	2016	2020	2026
23	Ron Caldwell	Rep	Wynne	2012	2020	2028
24	Keith Ingram	Dem	West Memphis	2012	2020	2024
25	Stephanie Flowers	Dem	Pine Bluff	2010	2020	2020
26	Eddie Cheatham	Dem	Crossett	2012	2020	2022
27	Trent Garner	Rep	El Dorado	2016	2020	2032
28	Jonathan Dismang	Rep	Beebe	2010	2020	2024
29	Ricky Hill	Rep	Cabot	2018 (special)	2020	
30	Linda Chesterfield	Dem	Little Rock	2010	2020	2020
31	Joyce Elliott	Dem	Little Rock	2008	2020	2020
32	Will Bond	Dem	Little Rock	2016	2020	2020
33	Kim Hammer	Rep	Benton	2018	2020	
34	Jane English	Rep	North Little Rock	2012	2020	2026
35	Jason Rapert	Rep	Conway	2010	2020	2026

== House of Representatives ==
=== Leadership ===
==== Officers ====
Office	Officer	Party	District
Speaker of the Arkansas House of Representatives	Matthew Shepherd	Republican	6
Speaker pro tempore	Jon Eubanks	Republican	74
Assistant Speaker pro tempore	Ken Bragg	Republican	15
Assistant Speaker pro tempore	Michelle Gray	Republican	62
Assistant Speaker pro tempore	Fred Allen	Democratic	30
Assistant Speaker pro tempore	Jon Payton	Republican	64

==== Floor Leaders ====
Office	Officer	Party	District
Majority Leader	Marcus Richmond	Republican	21
Majority Whip	Brandt Smith	Republican	58
Minority Leader	Fredrick Love	Democratic	29
Minority Whip	LeAnne Burch	Democratic	9

Source: Arkansas House of Representatives

=== Representatives ===
District	Name	Party	First elected	Term-limited
1	Carol Dalby	Rep	2016	2032
2	Lane Jean	Rep	2010	2026
3	Danny Watson	Rep	2016	2032
4	DeAnn Vaught	Rep	2014	2030
5	David Fielding	Dem	2010	2026
6	Matthew Shepherd	Rep	2010	2026
7	Sonia Eubanks Barker	Rep	2016	2032
8	Jeff Wardlaw	Rep	2010	2026
9	LeAnne Burch	Dem	2016	2032
10	Mike Holcomb	Rep	2012	2028
11	Don Edward Glover	Dem	2018	2034
12	Chris Richey	Dem	2012	2028
13	David Hillman	Rep	2012	2028
14	Roger Lynch	Rep	2016	2032
15	Ken Bragg	Rep	2012	2028
16	Ken Ferguson	Dem	2014	2030
17	Vivian Flowers	Dem	2014	2030
18	Richard Womack	Rep	2012	2028
19	Justin Gonzales	Rep	2014	2030
20	John Maddox	Rep	2016	2032
21	Marcus Richmond	Rep	2014	2030
22	Mickey Gates (Note: Expelled from office October 11, 2019. Richard McGrew (R) sworn March 18, 2020.)	Rep	2014	2030
23	Lanny Fite	Rep	2014	2030
24	Bruce Cozart	Rep	2011†	2028
25	Les Warren	Rep	2016	2032
26	Laurie Rushing	Rep	2014	2030
27	Julie Mayberry	Rep	2016	2032
28	Jasen Kelly	Rep	2018	2034
29	Fredrick Love	Dem	2010	2026
30	Fred Allen	Dem	2016	2032
31	Andy Davis	Rep	2012	2028
32	Jim Sorvillo	Rep	2014	2030
33	Tippi McCullough	Dem	2018	2034
34	John Walker (Note: Died in office October 28, 2019. Joy Springer (D) sworn March 18, 2020.)	Dem	2010	2026
35	Andrew Collins	Dem	2018	2034
36	Denise Ennett	Dem	2019†	2034
37	Jamie Aleshia Scott	Dem	2018	2028
38	Carlton Wing	Rep	2016	2032
39	Mark Lowery	Rep	2012	2028
40	Douglas House	Rep	2012	2028
41	Karilyn Brown	Rep	2014	2030
42	Mark Perry	Dem	2018	2034
43	Brian Evans	Rep	2018	2034
44	Cameron Cooper	Rep	2018	2034
45	Jim Wooten	Rep	2018	2034
46	Les Eaves	Rep	2014	2030
47	Craig Christiansen	Rep	2018	2034
48	Reginald Murdock	Dem	2010	2026
49	Steve Hollowell	Rep	2016	2032
50	Milton Nicks	Dem	2014	2030
51	Deborah Ferguson	Dem	2012	2028
52	Dwight Tosh	Rep	2014	2030
53	Dan Sullivan	Rep	2014	2030
54	Johnny Rye	Rep	2016	2032
55	Monte Hodges	Dem	2012	2028
56	Joe Jett	Rep	2012	2028
57	Jimmy Gazaway	Rep	2016	2032
58	Brandt Smith	Rep	2014	2030
59	Jack Ladyman	Rep	2014	2030
60	Frances Cavenaugh	Rep	2016	2032
61	Marsh Davis	Rep	2018	2034
62	Michelle Gray	Rep	2014	2030
63	Stu Smith	Rep	2018	2034
64	John Payton	Rep	2012	2028
65	Rick Beck	Rep	2014	2030
66	Josh Miller	Rep	2012	2028
67	Stephen Meeks	Rep	2010	2026
68	Stan Berry	Rep	2018	2034
69	Aaron Pilkington	Rep	2016	2032
70	Spencer Hawks	Rep	2018	2034
71	Joe Cloud	Rep	2018	2034
72	Stephen Magie	Dem	2012	2028
73	Mary Bentley	Rep	2014	2030
74	Jon Eubanks	Rep	2012	2028
75	Lee Johnson	Rep	2018	2034
76	Cindy Crawford	Rep	2018	2034
77	Justin Boyd	Rep	2014	2030
78	Jay Richardson	Dem	2018	2034
79	Gary Deffenbaugh	Rep	2010	2026
80	Charlene Fite	Rep	2012	2028
81	Bruce Coleman	Rep	2016	2032
82	Sarah Capp	Rep	2016	2032
83	Keith Slape	Rep	2018	2034
84	Denise Garner	Dem	2018	2034
85	David Whitaker	Dem	2012	2028
86	Nicole Clowney	Dem	2018	2034
87	Robin Lundstrum	Rep	2014	2030
88	Clint Penzo	Rep	2016	2032
89	Megan Godfrey	Dem	2018	2034
90	Jana Della Rosa	Rep	2014	2030
91	Dan Douglas	Rep	2012	2028
92	Gayla McKenzie	Rep	2018	2034
93	Jim Dotson	Rep	2012	2028
94	Rebecca Petty	Rep	2014	2030
95	Austin McCollum	Rep	2016	2032
96	Grant Hodges	Rep	2014	2030
97	Harlan Breaux	Rep	2018	2034
98	Ron McNair	Rep	2014	2030
99	Jack Fortner	Rep	2016	2032
100	Nelda Speaks	Rep	2014	2030

== See also ==
- List of Arkansas General Assemblies
