= 93rd Arkansas General Assembly =

2021–2022 Arkansas legislature

←	92nd	94th	→
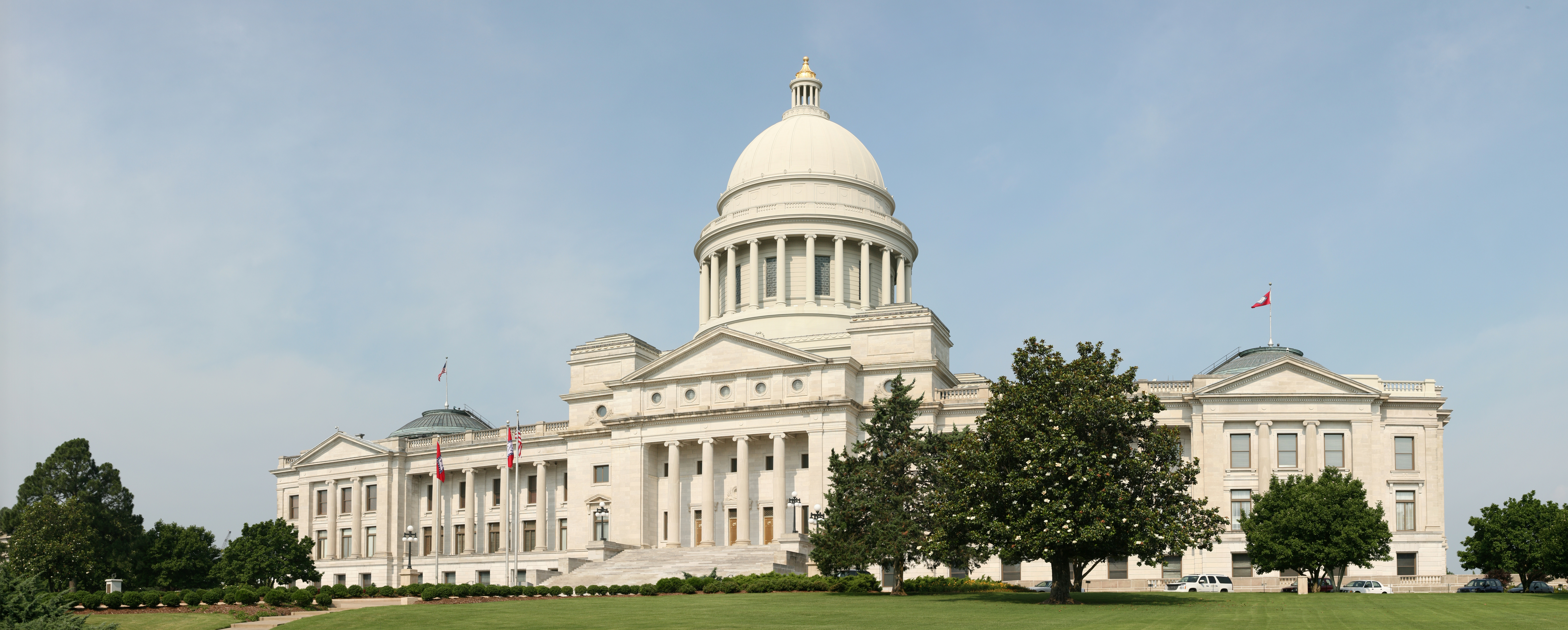
- Arkansas State Capitol (2009)

Overview
- Meeting place: Arkansas State Capitol
- Term: January 11, 2021 – January 8, 2023

Arkansas Senate
- Senate party standings
- Members: 35 (28 R, 7 D)
- President of the Senate: Tim Griffin (R)
- President Pro Tempore of the Senate: Jimmy Hickey, Jr. (R)
- Majority Leader: Bart Hester (R)
- Minority Leader: Keith Ingram (D)
- Party control: Republican Party

House of Representatives
- House party standings
- Members: 100 (78 R, 22 D)
- House Speaker: Matthew Shepherd (R)
- Speaker pro Tempore: John Eubanks (R)
- Majority Leader: Austin McCollum (R)
- Minority Leader: Tippi McCullough (D)
- Party control: Republican Party

Sessions
- 1st: January 11, 2021 –
- 2nd: August 4, 2021 –
- 3rd: December 7, 2021 – December 9, 2021
- 4th: February 14, 2022 – March 15, 2022
- 5th: August 9, 2022 – August 11, 2022

The Ninety-Third Arkansas General Assembly is the legislative body of the state of Arkansas in 2021 and 2022. The Arkansas Senate and Arkansas House of Representatives were both controlled by the Republicans. In the Senate, 28 senators were Republicans and 7 were Democrats. In the House, 78 representatives were Republicans and 22 were Democrats.

== Sessions ==
- The Regular Session of the 93rd General Assembly opened on January 11, 2021. It recessed due to two extreme winter storms (February 15 and February 17 in Arkansas) for the week of February 15. It adjourned sine die on April 24, 2019.
- The Fiscal Session began February 14, 2022 and concluded March 15.
- Governor Asa Hutchinson called for a special session to begin August 9, 2022 to lower the top income tax rate to 4.9% following a large state surplus. Bipartisan calls to use part of the surplus to raise teacher were ultimately ignored.

== Major events ==
=== Corruption and scandals ===
- Senators Mark Johnson (R-15th) and Alan Clark (R-13th) were punished for violating Senate Ethics rules on July 21, 2022. Johnson signed a sign-in sheet for Clark during a meeting he did not attend, and subsequently requesting reimbursement.
- Senator Alan Clark (R-13th) was suspended in a vote of the Senate for making "spurious, frivolous and retaliatory charges of ethics violations" against Senator Stephanie Flowers (D-25th).

=== Vacancies and party changes ===
- Senator Jim Hendren (R-2nd) left the Republican Party of Arkansas and became an independent politician on February 18 citing the party's reaction to the 2021 storming of the United States Capitol and President Donald Trump's behavior. The announcement drew national attention.
- Senator Lance Eads (R-7th) resigned on October 28, 2021. Colby Fulfer (R) won a special election on February 8, 2022, and was sworn in on February 22, 2022.

== Major legislation ==
The legislature was prolific during the regular session, considering 684 Senate bills and 986 House bills. A total of 1,100 bills become law.

- Some culture war issues were considered in this session, including transgender people in sports.

== Senate ==
=== Leadership ===
==== Officers ====
Office	Officer	Party	District
President/Lieutenant Governor	Tim Griffin	Republican	
President Pro Tempore of the Senate	Jimmy Hickey, Jr	Republican	11
Assistant Pro Tempore, 1st District	Ron Caldwell	Republican	23
Assistant Pro Tempore, 2nd District	Linda Chesterfield	Democrat	30
Assistant Pro Tempore, 3rd District	Lance Eads	Republican	7
Assistant Pro Tempore, 4th District	Bill Sample	Republican	14

==== Floor Leaders ====
Office	Officer	Party	District
Majority Leader	Scott Flippo	Republican	17
Majority Whip	Mathew Pitsch	Republican	8
Minority Leader	Keith Ingram	Democratic	24
Minority Whip	Larry Teague	Democratic	10

=== Senators ===
District	Name	Party	Residence	First elected	Seat up	Term-limited
1	Bart Hester	Rep	Cave Springs	2012	2024	2028
2	Jim Hendren	Rep (Note: Declared as an independent on February 18, 2021.)	Gravette	2012	2024	2028
3	Cecile Bledsoe	Rep	Rogers	2008	2022	2024
4	Greg Leding	Dem	Fayetteville	2018	2022	2034
5	Bob Ballinger	Rep	Berryville	2018	2022	2034
6	Gary Stubblefield	Rep	Branch	2012	2022	2028
7	Lance Eads	Rep	Springdale	2016	2024	2032
8	Mathew Pitsch	Rep	Fort Smith	2018	2022	2034
9	Terry Rice	Rep	Waldron	2014	2022	2030
10	Larry Teague	Dem	Nashville	2008	2022	2024
11	Jimmy Hickey Jr.	Rep	Texarkana	2012	2024	2028
12	Charles Beckham	Rep	McNeil	2020	2024	2036
13	Alan Clark	Rep	Lonsdale	2012	2024	2028
14	Bill Sample	Rep	Hot Springs	2010	2022	2026
15	Mark Johnson	Rep	Little Rock	2018	2022	2034
16	Breanne Davis	Rep	Russellville	2018 (special)	2024	2034
17	Scott Flippo	Rep	Mountain Home	2014	2022	2030
18	Missy Irvin	Rep	Mountain View	2010	2022	2026
19	James Sturch	Rep	Batesville	2018	2022	2034
20	Blake Johnson	Rep	Corning	2014	2022	2030
21	Dan Sullivan	Rep	Jonesboro	2014	2024	2030
22	Dave Wallace	Rep	Leachville	2016	2024	2032
23	Ron Caldwell	Rep	Wynne	2012	2024	2028
24	Keith Ingram	Dem	West Memphis	2012	2022	2028
25	Stephanie Flowers	Dem	Pine Bluff	2010	2024	2026
26	Ben Gilmore	Rep	Crossett	2020	2024	2036
27	Trent Garner	Rep	El Dorado	2016	2024	2032
28	Jonathan Dismang	Rep	Beebe	2010	2024	2026
29	Ricky Hill	Rep	Cabot	2018 (special)	2024	2034
30	Linda Chesterfield	Dem	Little Rock	2010	2022	2026
31	Joyce Elliott	Dem	Little Rock	2008	2022	2024
32	Clarke Tucker	Dem	Little Rock	2014	2024	2032
33	Kim Hammer	Rep	Benton	2018	2022	2034
34	Jane English	Rep	North Little Rock	2012	2024	2028
35	Jason Rapert	Rep	Conway	2010	2022	2026

== House of Representatives ==
=== Leadership ===
==== Officers ====
Office	Officer	Party	District
Speaker of the Arkansas House of Representatives	Matthew Shepherd	Republican	6
Speaker Pro Tempore	Jon Eubanks	Republican	74
Assistant Speaker pro tempore, 1st District	Michelle Gray	Republican	62
Assistant Speaker pro tempore, 2nd District	Marcus Richmond	Republican	21
Assistant Speaker pro tempore, 3rd District	Fred Allen	Democratic	30
Assistant Speaker pro tempore, 4th District	Frances Cavanaugh	Republican	60

==== Floor Leaders ====
Office	Officer	Party	District
Majority Leader	Austin McCollum	Republican	95
Majority Whip	John Payton	Republican	64
Minority Leader	Tippi McCullough	Democratic	33
Minority Whip	Denise Garner	Democratic	84

=== Representatives ===
District	Name	Party	First elected	Term-limited
1	Carol Dalby	Rep	2016	2032
2	Lane Jean	Rep	2010	2026
3	Danny Watson	Rep	2016	2032
4	DeAnn Vaught	Rep	2014	2030
5	David Fielding	Dem	2010	2026
6	Matthew Shepherd	Rep	2010	2026
7	Sonia Eubanks Barker	Rep	2016	2032
8	Jeff Wardlaw	Rep	2010	2026
9	Howard Beaty	Rep	2020	2036
10	Mike Holcomb	Rep	2012	2028
11	Mark McElroy	Rep	2012	2030
12	David Tollett	Rep	2020	2036
13	David Hillman	Rep	2012	2028
14	Roger Lynch	Rep	2016	2032
15	Ken Bragg	Rep	2012	2028
16	Ken Ferguson	Dem	2014	2030
17	Vivian Flowers	Dem	2014	2030
18	Richard Womack	Rep	2012	2028
19	Justin Gonzales	Rep	2014	2030
20	John Maddox	Rep	2016	2032
21	Marcus Richmond	Rep	2014	2030
22	Richard McGrew	Rep	2020 (special)	2036
23	Lanny Fite	Rep	2014	2030
24	Bruce Cozart	Rep	2011†	2028
25	Les Warren	Rep	2016	2032
26	Rick McClure	Rep	2020	2036
27	Julie Mayberry	Rep	2016	2032
28	Tony Furman	Rep	2020	2036
29	Fredrick Love	Dem	2010	2026
30	Fred Allen	Dem	2016	2032
31	Keith Brooks	Rep	2020	2036
32	Ashley Hudson	Dem	2020	2036
33	Tippi McCullough	Dem	2018	2034
34	Joy Springer	Dem	2020 (special)	2036
35	Andrew Collins	Dem	2018	2034
36	Denise Ennett	Dem	2019 (special)	2034
37	Jamie Aleshia Scott	Dem	2018	2028
38	Carlton Wing	Rep	2016	2032
39	Mark Lowery	Rep	2012	2028
40	David Ray	Rep	2020	2036
41	Karilyn Brown	Rep	2014	2030
42	Mark Perry	Dem	2018	2034
43	Brian S. Evans	Rep	2018	2034
44	Cameron Cooper	Rep	2018	2034
45	Jim Wooten	Rep	2018	2034
46	Les Eaves	Rep	2014	2030
47	Craig Christiansen	Rep	2018	2034
48	Reginald Murdock	Dem	2010	2026
49	Steve Hollowell	Rep	2016	2032
50	Milton Nicks	Dem	2014	2030
51	Deborah Ferguson	Dem	2012	2028
52	Dwight Tosh	Rep	2014	2030
53	Jon Milligan	Rep	2020	2036
54	Johnny Rye	Rep	2016	2032
55	Monte Hodges	Dem	2012	2028
56	Joe Jett	Rep	2012	2028
57	Jimmy Gazaway	Rep	2016	2032
58	Brandt Smith	Rep	2014	2030
59	Jack Ladyman	Rep	2014	2030
60	Frances Cavenaugh	Rep	2016	2032
61	Marsh Davis	Rep	2018	2034
62	Michelle Gray	Rep	2014	2030
63	Stu Smith	Rep	2018	2034
64	John Payton	Rep	2012	2028
65	Rick Beck	Rep	2014	2030
66	Josh Miller	Rep	2012	2028
67	Stephen Meeks	Rep	2010	2026
68	Stan Berry	Rep	2018	2034
69	Aaron Pilkington	Rep	2016	2032
70	Spencer Hawks	Rep	2018	2034
71	Joe Cloud	Rep	2018	2034
72	Stephen Magie	Dem	2012	2028
73	Mary Bentley	Rep	2014	2030
74	Jon Eubanks	Rep	2012	2028
75	Lee Johnson	Rep	2018	2034
76	Cindy Crawford	Rep	2018	2034
77	Justin Boyd	Rep	2014	2030
78	Jay Richardson	Dem	2018	2034
79	Gary Deffenbaugh	Rep	2010	2026
80	Charlene Fite	Rep	2012	2028
81	Bruce Coleman	Rep	2016	2032
82	Mark H. Berry	Rep	2020	2036
83	Keith Slape	Rep	2018	2034
84	Denise Garner	Dem	2018	2034
85	David Whitaker	Dem	2012	2028
86	Nicole Clowney	Dem	2018	2034
87	Robin Lundstrum	Rep	2014	2030
88	Clint Penzo	Rep	2016	2032
89	Megan Godfrey	Dem	2018	2034
90	Kendon Underwood	Rep	2020	2036
91	Delia Haak	Rep	2020	2036
92	Gayla Hendren McKenzie	Rep	2018	2034
93	Jim Dotson	Rep	2012	2028
94	John P. Carr	Rep	2014	2030
95	Austin McCollum	Rep	2016	2032
96	Joshua P. Bryant	Rep	2020	2036
97	Harlan Breaux	Rep	2018	2034
98	Ron McNair	Rep	2014	2030
99	Jack Fortner	Rep	2016	2032
100	Nelda Speaks	Rep	2014	2030
