= 94th Arkansas General Assembly =

2023–2024 Arkansas legislature

←	93rd	95th	→
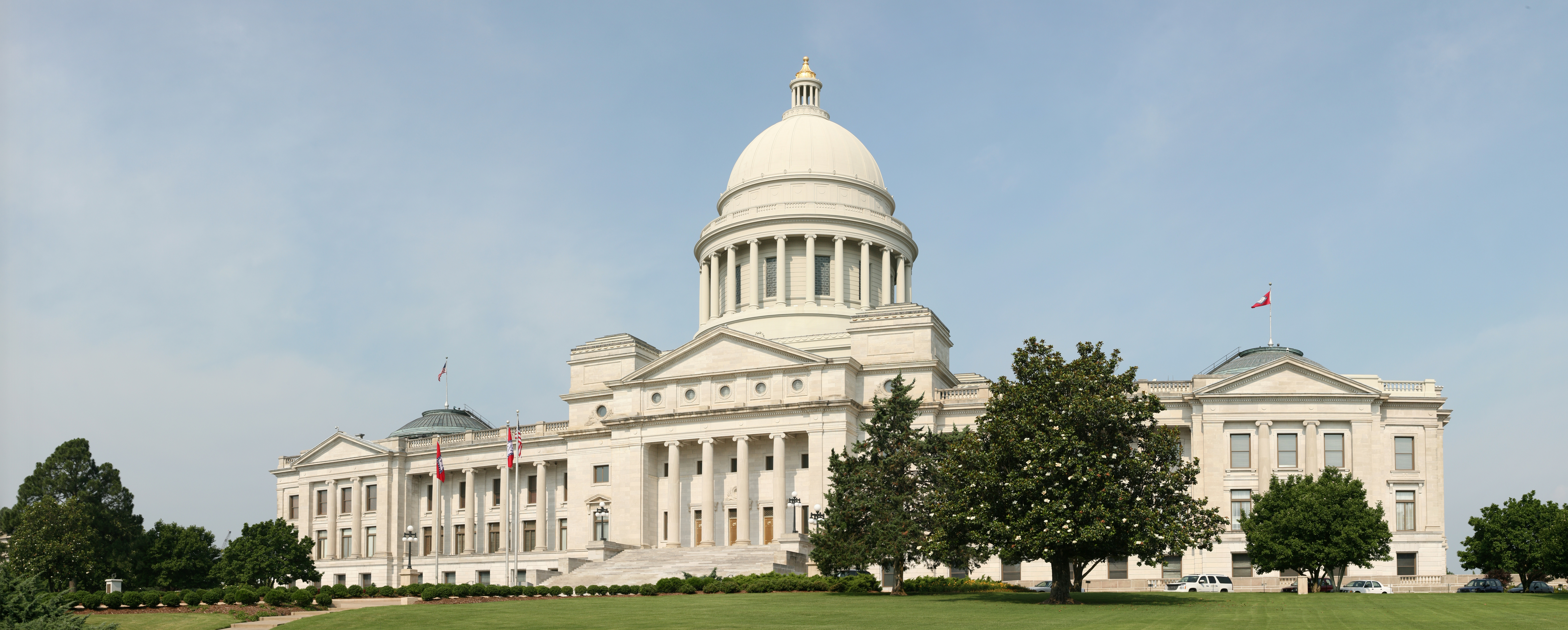
- Arkansas State Capitol (2009)

Overview
- Meeting place: Arkansas State Capitol
- Term: January 9, 2023 – May 1, 2023
- Website: www.arkleg.state.ar.us/

Arkansas Senate
- Senate party standings
- Members: 35 (29 R, 6 D)
- President of the Senate: Leslie Rutledge (R)
- President Pro Tempore of the Senate: Bart Hester (R)
- Majority Leader: Blake Johnson (R)
- Minority Leader: Greg Leding (D)
- Party control: Republican Party

House of Representatives
- House party standings
- Members: 100 (82 R, 18 D)
- House Speaker: Matthew Shepherd (R)
- Speaker pro Tempore: Jon Eubanks (R)
- Majority Leader: Marcus E. Richmond (R)
- Minority Leader: Tippi McCullough (D)
- Party control: Republican Party

Sessions
- 1st: January 9, 2023 – May 1, 2023
- 2nd: September 11, 2023 – September 14, 2023
- 3rd: April 10, 2024 – May 9, 2024
- 4th: June 17, 2024 – June 19, 2024

The Ninety-Forth Arkansas General Assembly is the legislative body of the state of Arkansas in 2023 and 2024. The Arkansas Senate and Arkansas House of Representatives were both controlled by the Republicans. In the Senate, 29 senators were Republicans and 6 were Democrats. In the House, 82 representatives were Republicans and 18 were Democrats.

== Sessions ==
The Regular Session of the 94th General Assembly opened on January 9, 2023. It adjourned sine die on May 1, 2023.

A special session was called by Governor of Arkansas Sarah Huckabee Sanders to begin September 11, 2023 to consider tax cuts and changes to the Arkansas Freedom of Information Act (FOIA) law. It ended after four days. The special session ended with an amendment to the FOIA law exempting information regarding travel on the state airplane, operated by the Arkansas State Police for use by the Governor of Arkansas and other constitutional officers. Several other provisions proposed by the governor to be exempted from FOIA, including deliberations among state officials, policy recommendations, and other information, were withdrawn after receiving broad bipartisan opposition.

The legislature assembled for the fiscal session on April 10, 2024. Governor Sanders' proposed $6.31 billion budget in 2024, with a 2% increase for 2025. The budget included large increases to fund school vouchers created by the Learns Act, as well as the Arkansas State Police and Arkansas Department of Corrections, with reductions to higher education. The budget was approved, but a standoff emerged over setting a potential cap on the salary for the director of the Arkansas Game and Fish Commission. The fiscal session adjourned May 9, 2024 without establishing funding for the commission, the first time the legislature had failed to fund a state agency during a fiscal session in over 30 years.

A second special session was called by Governor Sanders to cut taxes and fund the Arkansas Game and Fish Commission on June 17, 2024. The legislature reduced the top individual income tax rate to 3.9% and the state’s top corporate income tax rate to 4.3%, with no changes to lower income and middle income earners. Due to a disagreement about a cap on the director's possible salary, the legislature had allocated $0 to the Game and Fish Commission in the fiscal session, which typically received over $100 million to fund operations. Though the House and Senate had ultimately concurred on a compromise, the House had adjourned before it was approved during the fiscal session, requiring reconvening in a special session for ratification. The House also passed a resolution urging voters to vote against the Arkansas Right to Abortion Initiative's initiated constitutional amendment (which was ultimately not on the ballot in Arkansas). The special session adjourned June 19, 2024.

== Major legislation ==
The legislature passed 889 new laws during the regular session. The signature legislation included Governor Sanders' campaign priorities of education reform (Arkansas Learns Act), tax cuts, and culture war issues like transgender rights to book access at libraries.

== Senate ==
=== Leadership ===
==== Officers ====
Office	Officer	Party	District
President/Lieutenant Governor	Leslie Rutledge	Republican	N/A
President Pro Tempore of the Senate	Bart Hester	Republican	33
Assistant Pro Tempore, 1st District	Dan Sullivan	Republican	20
Assistant Pro Tempore, 2nd District	Clarke Tucker	Democrat	14
Assistant Pro Tempore, 3rd District	Jim Dotson	Republican	34
Assistant Pro Tempore, 4th District	Breanne Davis	Republican	25

==== Floor Leaders ====
Office	Officer	Party	District
Majority Leader	Blake Johnson	Republican	21
Majority Whip	Ricky Hill	Republican	11
Minority Leader	Greg Leding	Democratic	30
Minority Whip	Linda Chesterfield	Democratic	12

=== Senators ===
District	Name	Party	Residence	First elected	Seat up	Term-limited
1	Ben Gilmore	Rep	Crossett	2020	2024	2032
2	Matt Stone	Rep	Camden	2022	2026	2034
3	Steve Crowell	Rep	Magnolia	2022	2026	2034
4	Jimmy Hickey Jr.	Rep	Texarkana	2012	2024	2028
5	Terry Rice	Rep	Waldron	2014	2022	2030
6	Matt McKee	Rep	Pearcy	2022	2026	2034
7	Alan Clark	Rep	Lonsdale	2012	2024	2028
8	Stephanie Flowers	Dem	Pine Bluff	2010	2024	2026
9	Reginald Murdock	Dem	Marianna	2010	2026	2026
10	Ron Caldwell	Rep	Wynne	2012	2024	2028
11	Ricky Hill	Rep	Cabot	2018 (special)	2024	2034
12	Linda Chesterfield	Dem	Little Rock	2010	2022	2026
13	Jane English	Rep	North Little Rock	2012	2024	2028
14	Clarke Tucker	Dem	Little Rock	2014	2024	2032
15	Fredrick Love	Dem	Mabelvale	2010	2026	2026
16	Kim Hammer	Rep	Benton	2018	2022	2034
17	Mark Johnson	Rep	Little Rock	2018	2022	2034
18	Jonathan Dismang	Rep	Beebe	2010	2024	2026
19	Dave Wallace	Rep	Leachville	2016	2024	2032
20	Dan Sullivan	Rep	Jonesboro	2014	2024	2030
21	Blake Johnson	Rep	Corning	2014	2022	2030
22	John Payton	Rep	Wilburn	2012	2026	2028
23	Scott Flippo	Rep	Mountain Home	2014	2022	2030
24	Missy Irvin	Rep	Mountain View	2010	2022	2026
25	Breanne Davis	Rep	Russellville	2018 (special)	2024	2034
26	Gary Stubblefield	Rep	Branch	2012	2022	2028
27	Justin Boyd	Rep	Fort Smith	2014	2026	2030
28	Bryan King	Rep	Green Forest	2013	2026	2034
29	Jim Petty	Rep	Van Buren	2022	2026	2034
30	Greg Leding	Dem	Fayetteville	2018	2026	2034
31	Clint Penzo	Rep	Springdale	2016	2024	2032
12	Joshua P. Bryant	Rep	Rogers	2020	2024	2032
33	Bart Hester	Rep	Cave Springs	2012	2024	2028
34	Jim Dotson	Rep	Bentonville	2012	2026	2028
35	Tyler Dees	Rep	Siloam Springs	2022	2026	2034

== House of Representatives ==
=== Leadership ===
==== Officers ====
Office	Officer	Party	District
Speaker of the Arkansas House of Representatives	Matthew Shepherd	Republican	97
Speaker Pro Tempore	Jon Eubanks	Republican	46
Assistant Speaker pro tempore, 1st District	Charlene Fite	Republican	24
Assistant Speaker pro tempore, 2nd District	Jack Ladyman	Republican	32
Assistant Speaker pro tempore, 3rd District	DeAnn Vaught	Republican	87
Assistant Speaker pro tempore, 4th District	Fred Allen	Democratic	77

==== Floor Leaders ====
Office	Officer	Party	District
Majority Leader	Marcus E. Richmond	Republican	52
Majority Whip	Jon Milligan	Republican	33
Minority Leader	Tippi McCullough	Democratic	74
Minority Whip	Vivian Flowers	Democratic	65

=== Representatives ===
District	Name	Party	First elected	Term-limited
1	Jeremy Wooldridge	Rep	2022	2034
2	Trey Steimel	Rep	2022	2034
3	Stetson Painter	Rep	2022	2034
4	Jack Fortner	Rep	2016	2032
5	Ron McNair	Rep	2014	2030
6	Harlan Breaux	Rep	2018	2034
7	Britt McKenzie	Rep	2022	2034
8	Austin McCollum	Rep	2016	2032
9	DeAnna Hodges	Rep	2022	2034
10	Mindy McAlindon	Rep	2022	2034
11	Rebecca Burkes	Rep	2022	2034
12	Hope Hendren Duke	Rep	2022	2034
13	R. Scott Richardson	Rep	2022	2034
14	Grant Hodges	Rep	2014	2030
15	John P. Carr	Rep	2014	2030
16	Kendon Underwood	Rep	2020	2032
17	Delia Haak	Rep	2020	2032
18	Robin Lundstrum	Rep	2014	2030
19	Steve Unger	Rep	2022	2034
20	Denise Garner	Dem	2018	2034
21	Nicole Clowney	Dem	2018	2034
22	David Whitaker	Dem	2012	2028
23	Kendra Moore	Rep	2022	2034
24	Charlene Fite	Rep	2012	2028
25	Chad Puryear	Rep	2022	2034
26	Mark H. Berry	Rep	2020	2032
27	Steven Walker	Rep	2022	2034
28	Bart Schultz	Rep	2022	2034
29	Rick McClure	Rep	2020	2032
30	Frances Cavenaugh	Rep	2016	2032
31	Jimmy Gazaway	Rep	2016	2032
32	Jack Ladyman	Rep	2014	2030
33	Jon Milligan	Rep	2020	2032
34	Joey L. Carr	Rep	2022	2034
35	Milton Nicks	Dem	2014	2030
36	Johnny Rye	Rep	2016	2032
37	Steve Hollowell	Rep	2016	2032
38	Dwight Tosh	Rep	2014	2030
39	Wayne Long	Rep	2022	2034
40	Shad Pearce	Rep	2022	2034
41	Josh Miller	Rep	2012	2028
42	Stephen Meeks	Rep	2010	2026
43	Rick Beck	Rep	2014	2030
44	Stan Berry	Rep	2018	2034
45	Aaron Pilkington	Rep	2016	2032
46	Jon Eubanks	Rep	2012	2028
47	Lee Johnson	Rep	2018	2034
48	Ryan A. Rose	Rep	2022	2034
49	Jay Richardson	Dem	2018	2034
50	Zachary Gramlich	Rep	2022	2034
51	Cindy Crawford	Rep	2018	2034
52	Marcus Richmond	Rep	2014	2030
53	Matt Duffield	Rep	2022	2034
54	Mary Bentley	Rep	2014	2030
55	Matthew Brown	Rep	2022	2034
56	Stephen Magie	Dem	2012	2028
57	Cameron Cooper	Rep	2018	2034
58	Les Eaves	Rep	2014	2030
59	Jim Wooten	Rep	2018	2034
60	Roger Lynch	Rep	2016	2032
61	Jeremiah Moore	Rep	2022	2034
62	Mark McElroy	Rep	2012	2030
63	Deborah Ferguson	Dem	2012	2028
64	Ken Ferguson	Dem	2014	2030
65	Vivian Flowers	Dem	2014	2030
66	Mark Perry	Dem	2018	2034
67	Karilyn Brown	Rep	2014	2030
68	Brian S. Evans	Rep	2018	2034
69	David Ray	Rep	2020	2032
70	Carlton Wing	Rep	2016	2032
71	Brandon C. Achor	Rep	2022	2034
72	Jamie Aleshia Scott	Dem	2018	2028
73	Andrew Collins	Dem	2018	2034
74	Tippi McCullough	Dem	2018	2034
75	Ashley Hudson	Dem	2020	2032
76	Joy Springer	Dem	2020 (special)	2036
77	Fred Allen	Dem	2016	2032
78	Keith Brooks	Rep	2020	2032
79	Tara Shephard	Dem	2022	2034
80	Denise Ennett	Dem	2019 (special)	2034
81	R. J. Hawk	Rep	2022	2034
82	Tony Furman	Rep	2020	2032
83	Lanny Fite	Rep	2014	2030
84	Les Warren	Rep	2016	2032
85	Richard McGrew	Rep	2020 (special)	2036
86	John Maddox	Rep	2016	2032
87	DeAnn Vaught	Rep	2014	2030
88	Danny Watson	Rep	2016	2032
89	Justin Gonzales	Rep	2014	2030
90	Richard Womack	Rep	2012	2028
91	Bruce Cozart	Rep	2011†	2028
92	Julie Mayberry	Rep	2016	2032
93	Mike Holcomb	Rep	2012	2028
94	Jeff Wardlaw	Rep	2010	2026
95	Howard Beaty	Rep	2020	2032
96	Sonia Eubanks Barker	Rep	2016	2032
97	Matthew Shepherd	Rep	2010	2026
98	Wade Andrews	Rep	2022	2034
99	Lane Jean	Rep	2010	2026
100	Carol Dalby	Rep	2016	2032
