= 95th Arkansas General Assembly =

2024–2025 Arkansas legislature

←	94th	96th	→
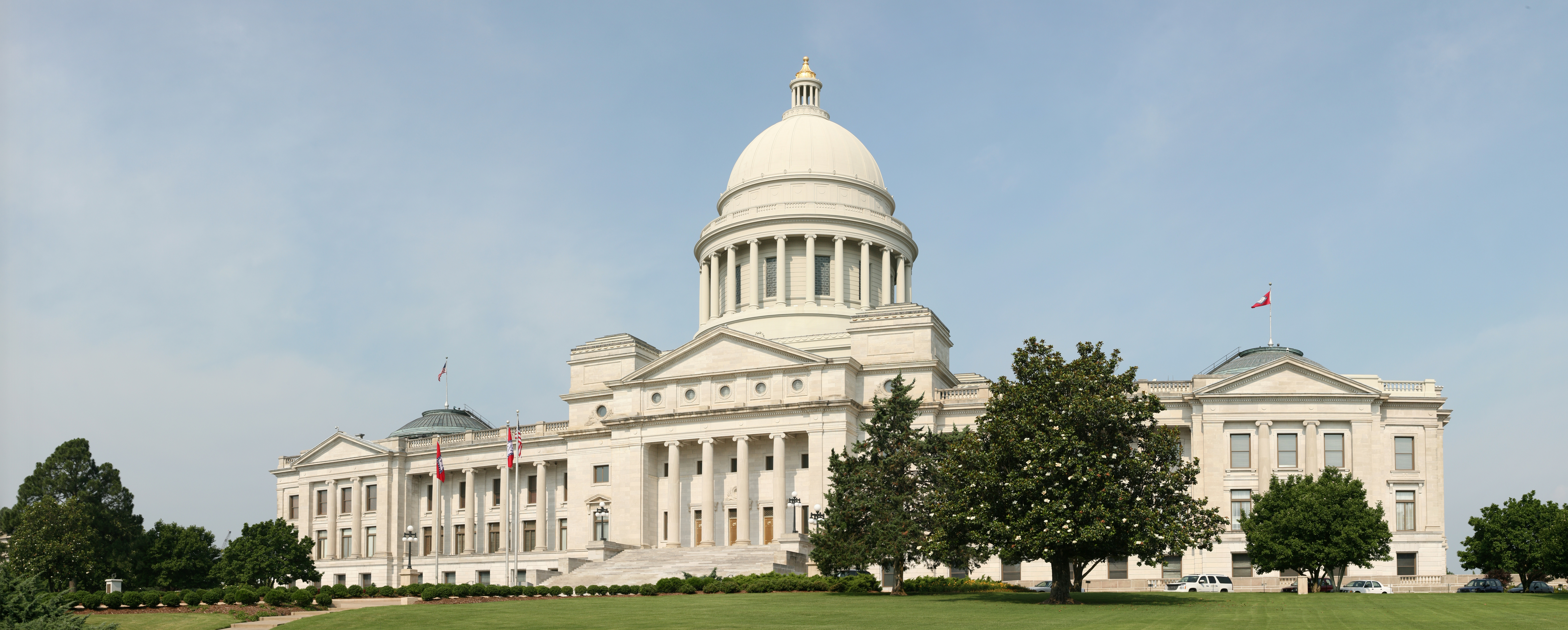
- Arkansas State Capitol (2009)

Overview
- Meeting place: Arkansas State Capitol
- Term: January 13, 2025 –
- Website: www.arkleg.state.ar.us/

Arkansas Senate
- Senate party standings
- Members: 35 (29 R, 6 D)
- President of the Senate: Leslie Rutledge (R)
- President Pro Tempore of the Senate: Bart Hester (R)
- Majority Leader: Blake Johnson (R)
- Minority Leader: Greg Leding (D)
- Party control: Republican Party

House of Representatives
- House party standings
- Members: 100 (81 R, 19 D)
- House Speaker: Brian S. Evans (R)
- Speaker pro Tempore: Jon Eubanks (R)
- Majority Leader: Howard Beaty (R)
- Minority Leader: Andrew Collins (D)
- Party control: Republican Party

Sessions
- 1st: January 13, 2025 – May 5, 2025
- 2nd: April 8, 2026 – April 29, 2026
- 3rd: May 4, 2026 – May 6, 2026

The Ninety-Fifth Arkansas General Assembly is the legislative body of the state of Arkansas in 2025 and 2026. The Arkansas Senate and Arkansas House of Representatives were both controlled by the Republicans. In the Senate, 29 senators were Republicans and 6 were Democrats. In the House, 81 representatives were Republicans and 19 were Democrats.

== Sessions ==
- The Regular Session of the 95th General Assembly opened on January 13, 2025. It adjourned sine die on May 5, 2025.

== Major events ==
=== Corruption and scandals ===
- Governor Sarah Huckabee Sanders initially set the House District 26 primary for March 3, 2026, with the general election November 3, 2026, but moved the general election to June 9, 2026 following widespread backlash. A Pulaski County judge ultimately ruled the governor's proposed dates violated the law requiring the election be scheduled 'as soon as practical' and within 150 days after the seat vacancy (which would be before February 23, 2026), and the Arkansas Supreme Court denied the governor's appeal.

=== Vacancies ===
- Representative Gary Stubblefield (R-26th) died September 2, 2025. Five Republican candidates sought the nomination in the primary election on January 6, 2026; resulting in a runoff election between Wade Dunn and Brad C. Simon scheduled for February 3.
- Representative Carlton Wing (R-70th) resigned on September 30, 2025 to become the executive director of Arkansas PBS. Two Democratic candidates sought the nomination in the primary election January 6, 2026; Alex Holladay defeated Republican Bo Renshaw in the general election on March 3, 2026 and was sworn in March 20, 2026.
- Senator Stan Berry (R-26th) died March 24, 2026. Bill Teeter won 31.4% in a four-candidate field in the Republican primary on June 2, 2026, and defeated Nikki Phillips, who had withdrawn but was still on the ballot, by a vote of 279-24, in the Republican runoff on June 30, 2026. Unopposed in the general election, Bill Teeter was sworn in August 17, 2026.

== Major legislation ==
A total of 1,026 bills became law; Governor Sanders vetoed two bills.

== Senate ==
=== Senators ===
District	Name	Party	Residence	First elected	Seat up	Term-limited
1	Ben Gilmore	Rep	Crossett	2020	2024	2032
2	Matt Stone	Rep	Camden	2022	2026	2034
3	Steve Crowell	Rep	Magnolia	2022	2026	2034
4	Jimmy Hickey Jr.	Rep	Texarkana	2012	2024	2028
5	Terry Rice	Rep	Waldron	2014	2022	2030
6	Matt McKee	Rep	Pearcy	2022	2026	2034
7	Alan Clark	Rep	Lonsdale	2012	2024	2028
8	Stephanie Flowers	Dem	Pine Bluff	2010	2024	2026
9	Reginald Murdock	Dem	Marianna	2010	2026	2026
10	Ron Caldwell	Rep	Wynne	2012	2024	2028
11	Ricky Hill	Rep	Cabot	2018 (special)	2024	2034
12	Jamie Scott	Dem	North Little Rock	2024	2030	2030
13	Jane English	Rep	North Little Rock	2012	2024	2028
14	Clarke Tucker	Dem	Little Rock	2014	2024	2032
15	Fredrick Love	Dem	Mabelvale	2010	2026	2026
16	Kim Hammer	Rep	Benton	2018	2022	2034
17	Mark Johnson	Rep	Little Rock	2018	2022	2034
18	Jonathan Dismang	Rep	Beebe	2010	2024	2026
19	Dave Wallace	Rep	Leachville	2016	2024	2032
20	Dan Sullivan	Rep	Jonesboro	2014	2024	2030
21	Blake Johnson	Rep	Corning	2014	2022	2030
22	John Payton	Rep	Wilburn	2012	2026	2028
23	Scott Flippo	Rep	Mountain Home	2014	2022	2030
24	Missy Irvin	Rep	Mountain View	2010	2022	2026
25	Breanne Davis	Rep	Russellville	2018 (special)	2024	2034
26	Gary Stubblefield (Note: Died in office September 2, 2025.)	Rep	Branch	2012	2022	2028
27	Justin Boyd	Rep	Fort Smith	2014	2026	2030
28	Bryan King	Rep	Green Forest	2013	2026	2034
29	Jim Petty	Rep	Van Buren	2022	2026	2034
30	Greg Leding	Dem	Fayetteville	2018	2026	2034
31	Clint Penzo	Rep	Springdale	2016	2024	2032
32	Joshua P. Bryant	Rep	Rogers	2020	2024	2032
33	Bart Hester	Rep	Cave Springs	2012	2024	2028
34	Jim Dotson	Rep	Bentonville	2012	2026	2028
35	Tyler Dees	Rep	Siloam Springs	2022	2026	2034

== House of Representatives ==
=== Representatives ===
District	Name	Party	First elected	Term-limited
1	Jeremy Wooldridge	Rep	2022	2034
2	Trey Steimel	Rep	2022	2034
3	Stetson Painter	Rep	2022	2034
4	Jason Nazarenko	Rep	2024	2040
5	Ron McNair	Rep	2014	2030
6	Harlan Breaux	Rep	2018	2034
7	Britt McKenzie	Rep	2022	2034
8	Austin McCollum	Rep	2016	2032
9	Diana Gonzales Worthen	Dem	2024	2040
10	Mindy McAlindon	Rep	2022	2034
11	Rebecca Burkes	Rep	2022	2034
12	Hope Hendren Duke	Rep	2022	2034
13	R. Scott Richardson	Rep	2022	2034
14	Nick Burkes	Rep	2024	2040
15	John P. Carr	Rep	2014	2030
16	Kendon Underwood	Rep	2020	2032
17	Randy Torres	Rep	2034	2040
18	Robin Lundstrum	Rep	2014	2030
19	Steve Unger	Rep	2022	2034
20	Denise Garner	Dem	2018	2034
21	Nicole Clowney	Dem	2018	2034
22	David Whitaker	Dem	2012	2028
23	Kendra Moore	Rep	2022	2034
24	Brad Hall	Rep	2024	2040
25	Chad Puryear	Rep	2022	2034
26	James Eaton	Rep	2024	2040
27	Steven Walker	Rep	2022	2034
28	Bart Schultz	Rep	2022	2034
29	Rick McClure	Rep	2020	2032
30	Frances Cavenaugh	Rep	2016	2032
31	Jimmy Gazaway	Rep	2016	2032
32	Jack Ladyman	Rep	2014	2030
33	Jon Milligan	Rep	2020	2032
34	Joey L. Carr	Rep	2022	2034
35	Jessie McGruder	Dem	2024	2040
36	Johnny Rye	Rep	2016	2032
37	Steve Hollowell	Rep	2016	2032
38	Dwight Tosh	Rep	2014	2030
39	Wayne Long	Rep	2022	2034
40	Shad Pearce	Rep	2022	2034
41	Alyssa Brown	Rep	2024	2040
42	Stephen Meeks	Rep	2010	2026
43	Rick Beck	Rep	2014	2030
44	Stan Berry (Note: Died in office March 23, 2026, replaced by Bill Teeter on August 17, 2026.)	Rep	2018	2034
45	Aaron Pilkington	Rep	2016	2032
46	Jon Eubanks	Rep	2012	2028
47	Lee Johnson	Rep	2018	2034
48	Ryan A. Rose	Rep	2022	2034
49	Jay Richardson	Dem	2018	2034
50	Zachary Gramlich	Rep	2022	2034
51	Cindy Crawford	Rep	2018	2034
52	Marcus Richmond	Rep	2014	2030
53	Matt Duffield	Rep	2022	2034
54	Mary Bentley	Rep	2014	2030
55	Matthew Brown	Rep	2022	2034
56	Stephen Magie	Dem	2012	2028
57	Cameron Cooper	Rep	2018	2034
58	Les Eaves	Rep	2014	2030
59	Jim Wooten	Rep	2018	2034
60	Roger Lynch	Rep	2016	2032
61	Jeremiah Moore	Rep	2022	2034
62	Mark McElroy	Rep	2012	2030
63	Lincoln Barnett	Dem	2024	2040
64	Ken Ferguson	Dem	2014	2030
65	Glenn Barnes	Dem	2024	2040
66	Mark Perry	Dem	2018	2034
67	Karilyn Brown	Rep	2014	2030
68	Brian S. Evans	Rep	2018	2034
69	David Ray	Rep	2020	2032
70	Carlton Wing (Note: Resigned from office October 30, 2025, replaced by Alex Holladay (D) on March 20, 2026.)	Rep	2016	2032
71	Brandon C. Achor	Rep	2022	2034
72	Tracy Steele	Dem	1998	2040
73	Andrew Collins	Dem	2018	2034
74	Tippi McCullough	Dem	2018	2034
75	Ashley Hudson	Dem	2020	2032
76	Joy Springer	Dem	2020 (special)	2036
77	Fred Allen	Dem	2016	2032
78	Keith Brooks	Rep	2020	2032
79	Tara Shephard	Dem	2022	2034
80	Denise Ennett	Dem	2019 (special)	2034
81	R. J. Hawk	Rep	2022	2034
82	Tony Furman	Rep	2020	2032
83	Paul Childress	Rep	2024	2040
84	Les Warren	Rep	2016	2032
85	Richard McGrew	Rep	2020 (special)	2036
86	John Maddox	Rep	2016	2032
87	DeAnn Vaught	Rep	2014	2030
88	Dolly Henley	Rep	2024	2040
89	Justin Gonzales	Rep	2014	2030
90	Richard Womack	Rep	2012	2028
91	Bruce Cozart	Rep	2011†	2028
92	Julie Mayberry	Rep	2016	2032
93	Mike Holcomb	Rep	2012	2028
94	Jeff Wardlaw	Rep	2010	2026
95	Howard Beaty	Rep	2020	2032
96	Sonia Eubanks Barker	Rep	2016	2032
97	Matthew Shepherd	Rep	2010	2026
98	Wade Andrews	Rep	2022	2034
99	Lane Jean	Rep	2010	2026
100	Carol Dalby	Rep	2016	2032
