= 2024 Arkansas Senate election =

- November 5, 2024

18 of 35 seats in the Arkansas Senate 18 seats needed for a majority
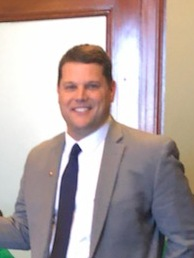

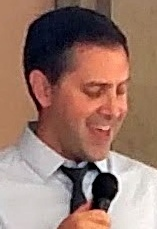
	Majority party	Minority party
Leader	Bart Hester	Greg Leding
Party	Republican	Democratic
Leader since	January 9, 2023	January 9, 2023
Leader's seat	33rd	30th
Seats before	29	6
Seats after	29	6
Seat change	Steady	Steady
Popular vote	430,976	97,521
Percentage	79.68%	18.03%
Swing	7.91%▲	4.78%▼
- Results: Republican hold Democratic hold No election
President Pro Tempore before election
Bart Hester
Republican
Elected President Pro Tempore
Bart Hester
Republican

The 2024 Arkansas Senate election was held on November 5, 2024, alongside the 2024 United States elections.

== Background ==
On February 20, early voting for the primary elections begun with the official day to vote on March 5.

== Composition ==
Affiliation	Party (Shading indicates majority caucus)		Total	
Affiliation	Republican	Democratic	Total	Vacant
Before Election	29	6	35	0
After Election	29	6	35	0
Change	Steady	Steady	35	Steady

== Retirements ==
One incumbent did not seek re-election.

=== Democrats ===
1. District 12: Linda Chesterfield retired.

== Predictions ==
Source	Ranking	As of
CNalysis	Solid R	March 16, 2024

== Results summary ==
County results with district splits Republicans: 50–60%; 60–70%; 70–80%; 80–90%; Unopposed; Democrats: Unopposed

District	2020 Pres.	Incumbent				Candidates	Result
District	2020 Pres.	Member	Party	First elected	Running	Candidates	Result
1	R +37.7	Ben Gilmore	Republican	2020	Yes	▌ ✓ Ben Gilmore (Republican); ▌Asher Williams (Libertarian)	Republican hold
3	R +31.0	Steve Crowell	Republican	2022	Yes	▌ ✓ Steve Crowell (Republican); Republican primary: ▌ ✓ Steve Crowell (Republican); ▌Mark Silvey (Republican)	Republican hold
4	R +46.5	Jimmy Hickey Jr.	Republican	2012	Yes	▌ ✓ Jimmy Hickey Jr. (Republican); ▌Lonny Mack Goodwin (Libertarian)	Republican hold
5	R +64.6	Terry Rice	Republican	2014	Yes	▌ ✓ Terry Rice (Republican)	Republican hold
6	R +33.9	Matt McKee	Republican	2022	Yes	▌ ✓ Matt McKee (Republican)	Republican hold
8	D +22.0	Stephanie Flowers	Democratic	2010	Yes	▌ ✓ Stephanie Flowers (Democratic)	Democratic hold
12	D +48.8	Linda Chesterfield	Democratic	2010	No	▌ ✓ Jamie Scott (Democratic)	Democratic hold
17	R +11.0	Mark Johnson	Republican	2018	Yes	▌ ✓ Mark Johnson (Republican); ▌Maureen Skinner (Democratic)	Republican hold
18	R +60.2	Jonathan Dismang	Republican	2010	Yes	▌ ✓ Jonathan Dismang (Republican)	Republican hold
19	R +42.7	David Wallace	Republican	2016	Yes	▌ ✓ David Wallace (Republican); Republican primary: ▌ ✓ David Wallace (Republican); ▌Tommy Wagner (Republican)	Republican hold
20	R +28.8	Dan Sullivan	Republican	2020	Yes	▌ ✓ Dan Sullivan (Republican); ▌Erika Askeland (Democratic)	Republican hold
22	R +60.4	John Payton	Republican	2022	Yes	▌ ✓ John Payton (Republican); ▌Sandy Maier (Democratic)	Republican hold
23	R +57.1	Scott Flippo	Republican	2014	Yes	▌ ✓ Scott Flippo (Republican)	Republican hold
25	R +46.0	Breanne Davis	Republican	2018 (special)	Yes	▌ ✓ Breanne Davis (Republican); ▌Michelle Justice (Democratic)	Republican hold
26	R +54.9	Gary Stubblefield	Republican	2012	Yes	▌ ✓ Gary Stubblefield (Republican)	Republican hold
29	R +47.6	Jim Petty	Republican	2022	Yes	▌ ✓ Jim Petty (Republican)	Republican hold
33	R +22.4	Bart Hester	Republican	2012	Yes	▌ ✓ Bart Hester (Republican)	Republican hold
34	R +22.7	Jim Dotson	Republican	2022	Yes	▌ ✓ Jim Dotson (Republican); ▌Kaylee Wedgeworth (Democratic)	Republican hold

== Detailed results ==
District 1 • District 3 • District 4 • District 5 • District 6 • District 8 • District 12 • District 17 • District 18 • District 19 • District 20 • District 22 • District 23 • District 25 • District 26 • District 29 • District 33 • District 34

=== District 1 ===
2024 Arkansas Senate election, 1st district general
Party	Candidate	Votes	%
Republican	Ben Gilmore (incumbent)	22,933	77.36%
Libertarian	Asher Williams	6,713	22.64%
Total votes		29,646	100.00
Republican hold			

=== District 3 ===
2024 Arkansas Senate election, 3rd district primary
Party	Candidate	Votes	%
Republican	Steve Crowell (incumbent)	5,497	71.4
Republican	Mark Silvey	2,202	28.6
Total votes		7,699	100.00

2024 Arkansas Senate election, 3rd district general
Party	Candidate	Votes	%
Republican	Steve Crowell (incumbent)	24,517	100
Total votes		24,517	100.00

=== District 4 ===
2024 Arkansas Senate election, 4th district general
Party	Candidate	Votes	%
Republican	Jimmy Hickey Jr. (incumbent)	23,721	80.74%
Libertarian	Lonny Mack Goodwin	5,658	19.26%
Total votes		29,379	100.00

=== District 5 ===
2024 Arkansas Senate election, 5th district general
Party	Candidate	Votes	%
Republican	Terry Rice (incumbent)	31,755	100
Total votes		31,755	100.00

=== District 6 ===
2024 Arkansas Senate election, 6th district general
Party	Candidate	Votes	%
Republican	Matt McKee (incumbent)	29,217	100
Total votes		29,217	100.00

=== District 8 ===
2024 Arkansas Senate election, 8th district general
Party	Candidate	Votes	%
Democratic	Stephanie Flowers (incumbent)	20,178	100
Total votes		20,178	100.00

=== District 12 ===
2024 Arkansas Senate election, 12th district general
Party	Candidate	Votes	%
Democratic	Jamie Scott	20,091	100
Total votes		20,091	100.00

=== District 17 ===
2024 Arkansas Senate election, 17th district general
Party	Candidate	Votes	%
Republican	Mark Johnson (incumbent)	22,030	58.23%
Democratic	Maureen Skinner	15,800	41.77%
Total votes		37,830	100.00

=== District 18 ===
2024 Arkansas Senate election, 18th district general
Party	Candidate	Votes	%
Republican	Jonathan Dismang (incumbent)	30,907	100%
Total votes		30,907	100.00

=== District 19 ===
2024 Arkansas Senate election, 19th district primary
Party	Candidate	Votes	%
Republican	David Wallace (incumbent)	5,151	73.72
Republican	Tommy Wagner	1,836	26.28
Total votes		7,699	100.00

2024 Arkansas Senate election, 19th district general
Party	Candidate	Votes	%
Republican	David Wallace (incumbent)	22,948	100
Total votes		22,948	100.00

=== District 20 ===
2024 Arkansas Senate election, 20th district general
Party	Candidate	Votes	%
Republican	Dan Sullivan (incumbent)	16,901	60.9
Democratic	Erika Askeland	10,851	39.1
Total votes		27,752	100.00

=== District 22 ===
2024 Arkansas Senate election, 22nd district general
Party	Candidate	Votes	%
Republican	John Payton (incumbent)	28,100	82.23
Democratic	Sandy Maier	6,071	17.77
Total votes		34,171	100.00

=== District 23 ===
2024 Arkansas Senate election, 23rd district general
Party	Candidate	Votes	%
Republican	Scott Flippo (incumbent)	34,646	100
Total votes		34,646	100.00

=== District 25 ===
2024 Arkansas Senate election, 25th district general
Party	Candidate	Votes	%
Republican	Breanne Davis (incumbent)	24,168	74.21
Democratic	Michelle Justice	8,397	25.79
Total votes		32,565	100.00

=== District 26 ===
2024 Arkansas Senate election, 26th district general
Party	Candidate	Votes	%
Republican	Gary Stubblefield (incumbent)	30,500	100
Total votes		30,500	100.00

=== District 29 ===
2024 Arkansas Senate election, 29th district general
Party	Candidate	Votes	%
Republican	Jim Petty (incumbent)	29,289	100
Total votes		29,289	100.00

=== District 33 ===
2024 Arkansas Senate election, 33rd district general
Party	Candidate	Votes	%
Republican	Bart Hester (incumbent)	30,530	100
Total votes		30,530	100.00

=== District 34 ===
2024 Arkansas Senate election, 34th district general
Party	Candidate	Votes	%
Republican	Jim Dotson (incumbent)	28,119	63.88
Democratic	Kaylee Wedgeworth	15,897	36.12
Total votes		44,016	100.00

== See also ==
- 2024 Arkansas elections
- 2024 Arkansas House of Representatives elections
- Arkansas Senate
- List of Arkansas General Assemblies
