= Arkansas House Bill 1570 (2021) =

2021 Arkansas state law

Save Adolescents from Experimentation Act

93rd Arkansas General Assembly
- Long title: An act to create the Arkansas Save Adolescents From Experimentation (SAFE) Act; and for other purposes.
- Citation: A.R. Legis. Assemb. Act 626. Reg. Sess. 2021-2022 (2021).
- Territorial extent: Arkansas
- Passed by: Arkansas House of Representatives
- Passed: March 10, 2021
- Passed by: Arkansas Senate
- Passed: March 29, 2021

Legislative history

Initiating chamber: Arkansas House of Representatives
- Bill title: House Bill 1570
- Introduced by: Robin Lundstrum (R–87)
- First reading: February 25, 2021
- Second reading: February 25, 2021
- Third reading: March 10, 2021

Revising chamber: Arkansas Senate
- Bill title: House Bill 1570
- Member(s) in charge: Alan Clark (R–13)
- First reading: March 10, 2021
- Second reading: March 10, 2021
- Third reading: March 29, 2021

Summary
- Bans gender affirming medical procedures for youth, prohibits the use of public funds for and prohibits insurance from covering "gender transition procedures", enables disciplinary action against medical professionals who violate the ban
- Status: In force

Arkansas House Bill 1570 (HB 1570), also known as the Save Adolescents From Experimentation (SAFE) Act or Act 626, is a 2021 law in the state of Arkansas that bans gender-affirming medical procedures for transgender people under 18, including puberty blockers, hormone therapy, and sex reassignment surgery. The law also bans the use of public funds for and prohibits insurance from covering gender transition procedures, while doctors who provide treatment in violation of the ban can be sued for damages or professionally sanctioned. The measure makes Arkansas the first U.S. state to make gender-affirming medical care illegal.

In early 2020, state Republican lawmakers introduced numerous bills restricting access to gender-affirming healthcare; the measures did not pass partly due to state legislatures adjourning due to the COVID-19 pandemic and forgoing committee votes on the measures. Efforts to pass the healthcare bans were renewed the following year: as of March 2021, the Williams Institute has documented legislation in 21 states that seek to prevent access to gender-affirming medical care for transgender youth. Prior to HB 1570, Arkansas governor Asa Hutchinson had signed two bills criticized as targeting transgender people: Senate Bill 354, a transgender sports bill, and Senate Bill 289, a religious and moral exemptions bill for doctors.

HB 1570 was introduced in February 2021, and passed through the Arkansas General Assembly by March. Governor Asa Hutchinson vetoed the measure in April, but was overridden by the legislature. The law would have taken effect in July, but was stayed by a federal judge pending the outcome of a lawsuit filed by the American Civil Liberties Union in May. An appeals court upheld the injunction in August 2022.

Supporters of the bill, include several conservative organizations and Republican politicians, claim that gender transition procedures are experimental, that their long-term effects have not been established, and that minors need to be protected from making permanent changes to their bodies. Several national medical organizations have disputed these claims and opposed the bill, including the American Medical Association, the American Psychological Association, and the American Academy of Pediatrics. Some detractors and LGBT organizations have alleged that the bill represents the anti-transgender beliefs of its supporters. Governor Hutchinson argued that the bill represented "vast government overreach".

== Provisions ==
HB 1570 bans doctors from providing any "gender transition procedures" to transgender people under 18, defined as any medical or surgical service that alters a person's sex, including puberty blockers, hormone therapy, and sex reassignment surgery. The bill also prohibits doctors from referring patients to other providers for such treatment. It does not include a grandfather clause for minors undergoing treatment at the time of the ban. The bill contains specific exceptions to the ban on medical services for intersex medical interventions or patients dealing with complications from previous gender-related medical treatment. Doctors who provide treatment in violation of the ban can be sued for damages or professionally sanctioned.

HB 1570 also bans the use of public funds for and prohibits insurance from covering gender transition procedures for minors.

== Background ==
Gender-affirming healthcare is a type of healthcare that treats gender dysphoria—mental distress caused when a person's assigned sex at birth does not match their gender identity. Gender-affirming healthcare for transgender youth is regulated by Standards of Care set by the World Professional Association for Transgender Health. Treatment for youth begins with therapy and counseling, and may progress to the use of puberty blockers depending on individuals' age and physical development; the medication halts puberty to give youth time to make a decision about their transition. Hormone replacement therapy may be prescribed to youth around 16 years old, causing them to develop sexual characteristics associated with their gender. Trans youth rarely undergo sex reassignment surgery because the Standards of Care require patients to be legally considered adults; some non-sex reassignment surgeries are performed for youth on a case-by-case basis. Gender-affirming healthcare has been shown to improve trans youth's mental health, social acceptance and relations, and legal recognition. It is recommended by several professional associations, including the American Academy of Pediatrics and the Endocrine Society. However, research on the long-term effects of puberty blockers is limited.

Previous controversy surrounding transgender rights in the United States in the late 2010s focused primarily on "bathroom bills" that legally required transgender people to use bathrooms based on their assigned sex at birth, such as North Carolina's House Bill 2 in 2016. According to the Harvard Law Review, the debate about transgender healthcare for youth garnered national attention in October 2019 when "a dispute in Texas family court over parental rights for a seven-year-old transgender girl ignited outrage in conservative circles". The journal asserted that conservative lobbying groups such as The Heritage Foundation and the Family Policy Alliance lobbied politicians throughout 2019 to introduce bills in legislative sessions banning gender-affirming healthcare for minors; measures were proposed in 15 states between January and March 2020. None of the bills passed, partly due to state legislatures adjourning due to the COVID-19 pandemic and forgoing committee votes on the measures.

Efforts to pass the healthcare bans were renewed the following year: as of March 2021, the Williams Institute, an LGBT-focused research institute, has documented legislation in 21 states that seek to prevent access to gender-affirming medical care for youth. Bills in several states would penalize parents who seek out or otherwise facilitate gender-affirming healthcare. Some, including HB 1570, would allow individuals to sue medical providers who violate the legislation in civil courts. Three bills (HB 1570, and in Texas and South Carolina) contain insurance-related restrictions.

Republican politicians have also introduced bills that would ban transgender youth from participating in youth sports. As of early April 2021, three states (Arkansas, Mississippi, and Tennessee) had passed transgender sports bans, while state legislatures in over two dozen states were considering similar measures.

Prior to HB 1570, Arkansas governor Asa Hutchinson had signed two bills criticized as targeting transgender people. Senate Bill 354, a transgender sports bill, banned transgender women and girls from competing in women's sports teams in school. Hutchinson also signed Senate Bill 289, which allows doctors to refuse to treat someone based on religious or moral objections; opponents claimed the legislation would give doctors and healthcare providers the ability to deny healthcare to LGBTQ patients. Both bills were signed into law on March 26, 2021.

According to the Williams Institute, there are 1,800 transgender people between the ages of 13 and 17 in Arkansas.

== History ==
HB 1570 was first read in the Arkansas House of Representatives on February 25, 2021. Following its second reading on the same day, the bill was referred to the House's Public Health, Welfare and Labor Committee, who passed the bill on March 9. The bill passed the House 70–22 following its third reading on March 10, with 8 representatives non-voting. Following its first and second readings in the Arkansas Senate on March 10, HB 1570 was referred to the Senate's Public Health, Welfare and Labor Committee, who passed the bill on March 22. The Senate voted 28–7 to pass the bill following its third reading on March 29. Governor Hutchinson vetoed the bill on April 5. The state legislature overrode the governor's veto the next day, with the House voting 71–24 with 3 representatives non-voting, and the Senate voting 25–8 to pass the bill.

HB 1570 would have taken effect on July 28, 2021, but was stayed on July 21 by federal judge James Moody pending a lawsuit filed by the American Civil Liberties Union (ACLU) on May 25 in the U.S. District Court for the Eastern District of Arkansas; the ACLU argued that the statute violated the Constitution. The Department of Justice filed a statement of interest in the litigation on June 17, asserting that the Equal Protection Clause of the Fourteenth Amendment protects transgender youth from discrimination in their access to medical care and also that HB 1570 violates the Constitution.

An appeals court upheld the injunction in August 2022.

Starting on October 17, 2022, a two-week long federal trial in the U.S. District Court for the Eastern District of Arkansas regarding the legality of HB 1570 began. The lawsuit leading to the trial was filed by the American Civil Liberties Union (ACLU), four families of transgender youth, and two doctors.

The bill makes Arkansas the first U.S. state to make gender transition procedures illegal.

== Legal challenges ==
In 2021, U.S. District Judge Jay Moody issued a temporary injunction on the law before it could take effect. Moody then issued a permanent injunction on the law in May 2022. A three-judge panel from the U.S. Court of Appeals for the Eighth Circuit upheld the injunction in August 2022. In September 2023, Attorney General Tim Griffin asked the full panel of judges from the Eighth Circuit to reconsider the ruling as opposed to a three-judge panel. In October 2023, the court granted his request. On April 11, 2024, ten judges on the Eighth Circuit heard oral arguments over whether to reinstate the law. Chief Judge Steven Colloton said a decision would be issued "in due course." In August 2025, the Eighth Circuit reversed the lower court's decision, allowing Arkansas to enforce its ban on gender-affirming care for minors.

== Reactions ==
=== Support ===
Supporters of the bill claimed that gender transition procedures are experimental and that their long-term effects have not been established. HB 1570's author, state Representative Robin Lundstrum (R–87), argued that her support was driven by science, saying she consulted medical experts while writing the bill; she referenced one Swedish study from 2011 finding that transgender people who underwent sex reassignment surgery were more likely to suffer mental health issues and commit suicide than the general population. (Note: The study also found that "surgeries eased gender dysphoria". The authors of the study concluded that "Persons with transsexualism, after sex reassignment, have considerably higher risks for mortality, suicidal behaviour, and psychiatric morbidity than the general population. Our findings suggest that sex reassignment, although alleviating gender dysphoria, may not suffice as treatment for transsexualism, and should inspire improved psychiatric and somatic care after sex reassignment for this patient group.") Primary Senate sponsor Alan Clark (R–13) described gender-affirming treatment as experimental and potentially life-threatening, arguing that the bill would "protect children from making mistakes that they will have a very difficult time coming back from." Republican Attorney General Leslie Rutledge said that the bill "is about protecting children", adding that "Nothing about this law prohibits someone after the age of 18 from making this decision. What we're doing in Arkansas is protecting children from life-altering, permanent decisions."

Family Council, a conservative organization in Arkansas, claimed that the long-term effects of gender-affirming healthcare are unknown, while Vernadette Broyles, president of the law firm Child & Parental Rights Campaign, characterized the banned treatments as "unethical experimentation on [children's] developing bodies." The American College of Pediatricians, a socially conservative group, said that "affirming gender discordance too early will push young people to transition."

Sarah Huckabee Sanders, while running in the 2022 Arkansas gubernatorial election, said she supported HB 1570 and would have signed it if she were governor. Both of her opponents in the race, Democrat Chris Jones and Libertarian Ricky Harrington Jr., said that they would have vetoed the legislation.

=== Opposition ===
The bill garnered criticism from several national medical organizations regarding its scientific accuracy. Major professional associations including the American Medical Association, the American Psychological Association, the American Psychiatric Association, and the Endocrine Society opposed the measure, disputing the claim that gender-affirming healthcare is experimental and harmful. American Academy of Pediatrics president Lee Beers described the bill as "discrimination by legislation", while the American Academy of Child and Adolescent Psychiatry expressed concern about "state-based legislation regarding the treatment of transgender youth that directly oppose the evidence based care". Gary Wheeler, a senior figure in the Arkansas chapter of the American Academy of Pediatrics, claimed that outside interest groups lobbied Arkansas lawmakers and polarized the issue; the Human Rights Campaign accused groups like The Heritage Foundation, the Alliance Defending Freedom, and the Eagle Forum of promoting the legislation. Wheeler alleged that supporters of the bill cherry-picked information and misread scientific studies. Noting that transgender youth healthcare is typically undertaken only after discussions between the patient, their parents, and physicians, Beers argued the bill would violate the physician-patient relationship by preventing doctors from providing care for transgender patients.

Some detractors and LGBT organizations have alleged that the bill represents anti-transgender beliefs by its supporters. Rumba Yambú, the director of the Arkansas transgender support organization Intratransitive, claimed that HB 1570 was "one of the worst bills that [the legislature] could have created", while Lambda Legal CEO Kevin Jennings said that measures like HB 1570 "are rooted in animus and ignorance about what it means to be transgender." Writer Jennifer Finney Boylan claimed in The New York Times that conservative supporters of the bill were using concern for children as a pretense to express anti-transgender sentiment. Contending that HB 1570 and similar bills across the country "come from a place of emotional incoherence", The Washington Post columnist Monica Hesse asserted that the measures are based on "a combination of ignorance and discomfort" around transgender people. Writing in The Atlantic, law professor Ronald J. Krotoszynski Jr. argued that the bill violated the Fourteenth Amendment, conflicting with the Equal Protection Clause and with "the Constitution's guarantee of personal liberty" by discriminating against transgender people, and the Due Process Clause by interfering with the right of parents to raise their children.

In June 2021, Rob Bonta, the Attorney General of California, announced that the state would no longer provide non-essential state-funded travel to five states (Note: California had previously banned state-funded travel (with limited exceptions) to twelve states; the new ban increases the number of banned states to seventeen.) which had passed anti-LGBT laws, including Arkansas.

==== Veto by Asa Hutchinson ====
Governor Asa Hutchinson vetoed the bill on April 5, 2021, saying he feared it would set "new standards of legislative interference" and represented "vast government overreach". Asserting that he would have signed a bill that only banned sex reassignment surgery for transgender youth, Hutchinson also voiced concerns that the bill was part of a "culture war" fought by conservatism and argued that it would prove politically damaging to the Republican Party by "reflecting intolerance and reflecting a lack of diversity." The veto was overridden the next day by the legislature.

== See also ==
- Transgender health care
- LGBT rights in Arkansas
- Transgender rights in the United States
