= Senator McKee =

Senator McKee may refer to:

- Gertrude Dills McKee (1885–1948), North Carolina State Senate
- Matt McKee (fl. 2020s), Arkansas State Senate
