= John Cooper (Arkansas politician) =

American politician

John R. Cooper

Member of the Arkansas Senate from the 21st district
- In office January 29, 2014 – January 11, 2021
- Preceded by: Paul Bookout
- Succeeded by: Dan Sullivan

Personal details
- Born: 1947 (age 78–79) Heber Springs, Arkansas
- Party: Republican
- Spouse: Betty Sue
- Children: 2
- Occupation: Retired (AT&T); Primitive Baptist Minister

Military service
- Allegiance: United States
- Branch/service: United States Army

John R. Cooper (born 1947), is a Republican politician from Jonesboro, Arkansas. He won a special election to fill a partial term in the Arkansas Senate in 2014, and was reelected in 2016. He lost his reelection bid in the Republican Primary in March 2020.

== Electoral history ==
=== 2012 Arkansas House of Representatives ===
Cooper ran for the District 59 Arkansas House of Representatives in 2012 against Democrat Butch Wilkins. Wilkins defeated Cooper, but was term-limited in 2014.

Arkansas House of Representatives District 59
Party	Candidate	Votes	%
Democratic	Butch Wilkins	4,390	53.7%
Republican	John R. Cooper	3,790	46.3%
Democratic hold			

=== 2014 Arkansas Senate (special) ===
Cooper intended to run for the District 59 seat again in 2014, but rather entered a special election for District 21 in the Arkansas Senate following Paul Bookout's resignation in 2013 under an ethics cloud. In the three- candidate Republican primary on October 8, 2013, Cooper won the primary by 6 votes over Dan Sullivan, with Chad Niell in a distant third, but failed to obtain the 50% necessary to avoid a runoff election. Cooper defeated Sullivan in the November 12, 2013 runoff by 67 votes.67 votes

The general election pitted Cooper against Steven Eric Rockwell, who had emerged from a Democratic primary. Cooper carried the support of the Tea Party movement. Rockwell manages his family printing and publishing business in Jonesboro and called himself a "centrist" in the race. Retiring Democratic Governor Mike Beebe cut ads for Rockwell. The election quickly became centered on the Private Option, with Rockwell for and Cooper against. It was also closely watched as a bellwether for the November 2014 elections in Arkansas.

Cooper won election on January 14, 2014, and was seated in the 89th Arkansas General Assembly. Cooper became the 23rd Republican in the 35-member Arkansas Senate, which had been 100 percent Democratic until 1969. In the campaign, Cooper said that he considers ethics reform and wasteful government spending among his legislative priorities.

Arkansas Senate District 21 Special Election
Party	Candidate	Votes	%
Republican	John R. Cooper	4,314	57.2
Democratic	Steven Eric Rockwell	3,227	42.8
Republican gain from Democratic			

=== 2016 Arkansas Senate ===
In November 2016, Cooper won re-election to a full term in the Arkansas Senate unopposed in either the Republican primary or the general election.

=== 2020 Arkansas Senate ===
Cooper was primaried by House Rep. Dan Sullivan in March 2020.

Arkansas Senate District 21, Republican Primary
Party	Candidate	Votes	%
Republican	Dan Sullivan	5,493	58.6
Republican	John R. Cooper	3,883	41.4

Sullivan went on to win the seat unopposed in November, and was seated in the 93rd Arkansas General Assembly.

Preceded by Paul Bookout	Arkansas State Senator for District 21 (Craighead County); January 29, 2014–January 11, 2021	Succeeded by Dan Sullivan
