= Jon Milligan =

American politician

Majority Whip of the Arkansas House of Representatives
- Incumbent
- Assumed office January 9, 2023
- Preceded by: John Payton

Member of the Arkansas House of Representatives from the 33rd district
- Incumbent
- Assumed office January 9, 2023
- Preceded by: Tippi McCullough

Member of the Arkansas House of Representatives from the 53rd district
- In office January 11, 2021 – January 9, 2023
- Preceded by: Dan Sullivan
- Succeeded by: Matt Duffield

Personal details
- Party: Republican

Jon Milligan (born May 4, 1956) is an American politician serving as a member of the Arkansas House of Representatives for the 33rd district and as Majority Whip. Elected in November 2022, he assumed office on January 9, 2023.

== Career ==
Milligan was elected to the Arkansas House of Representatives in November 2020 to the 53rd District and assumed office on January 11, 2021 During the 2023 legislative session, he served on the House Judiciary Committee, the House State Agencies and Governmental Affairs Committee, and the Joint Budget Committee.
