= Arkansas State University =

Public university in Jonesboro, Arkansas, U.S.

Coordinates: 35°50′28″N 90°40′47″W

- Former name: List: First District Agricultural School (1909–1925) First District Agricultural and Mechanical College (1925–1933) Arkansas State College (1933–1967)
- Motto: "Educate, Enhance, Enrich"
- Type: Public research university
- Established: April 1, 1909; 117 years ago
- Parent institution: Arkansas State University System
- Accreditation: HLC
- Academic affiliations: ORAU; space-grant
- Endowment: $153.4 million (2025)
- Budget: $195 million (FY 2026)
- Chancellor: Todd Shields
- Provost: Calvin White, Jr.
- Academic staff: 481
- Administrative staff: 1,095
- Students: 17,926 (fall 2025)
- Location: Jonesboro, Arkansas, United States
- Campus: Small city, 1,376 acres (5.57 km^{2})
- Other campuses: Colón
- Newspaper: The Herald
- Colors: Scarlet and black
- Nickname: Red Wolves
- Sporting affiliations: NCAA Division I FBS – Sun Belt; CUSA
- Mascots: Howl and Scarlet
- Website: www.astate.edu
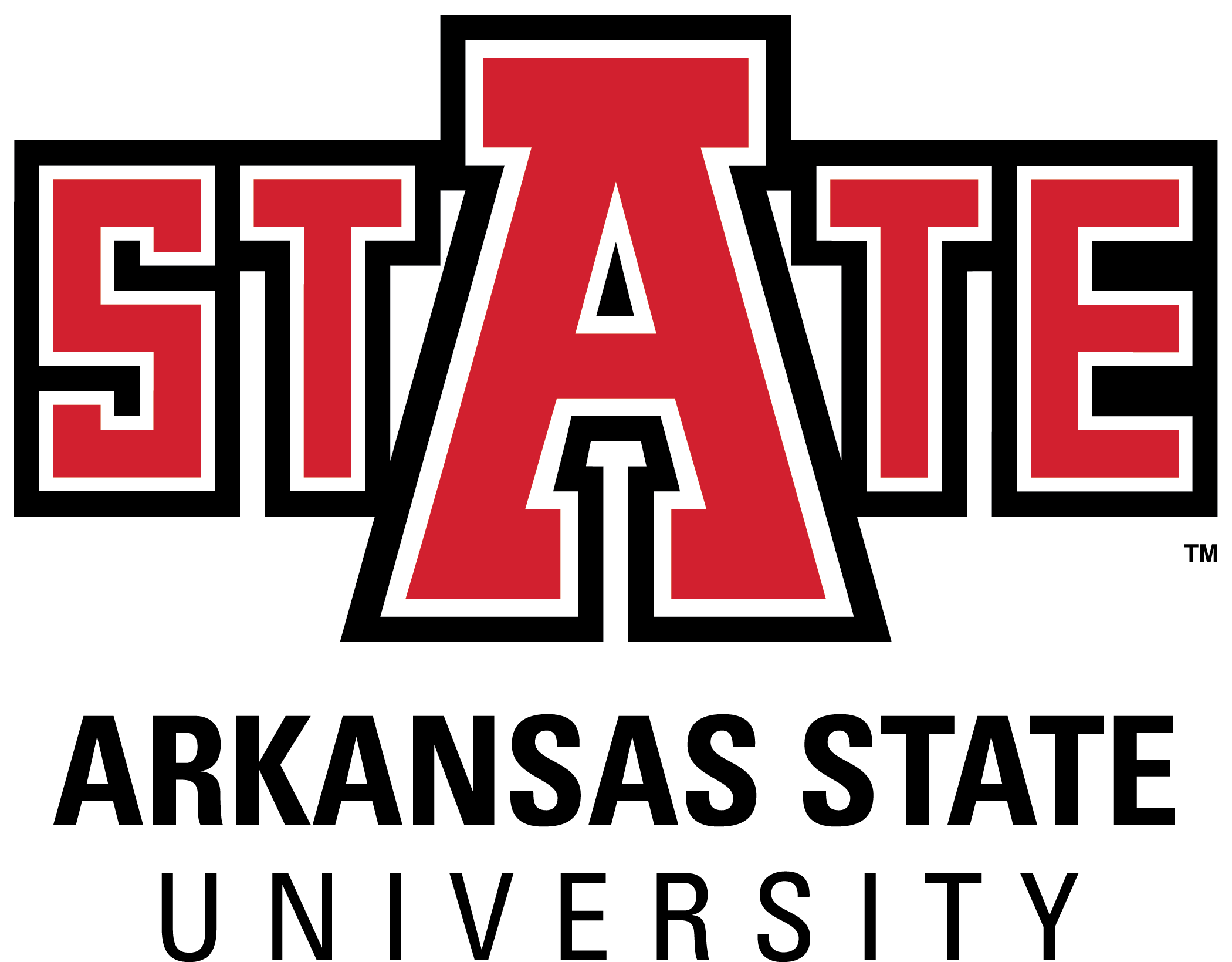

Arkansas State University (A-State or ASU) is a public research university in Jonesboro, Arkansas, United States. It is the flagship campus of the Arkansas State University System and the second-largest university in the state. The university was founded in 1909 and is located atop 1,376 acres (557 hectares) on Crowley's Ridge.

Arkansas State University is classified among "R2: Doctoral Universities – High research activity".

== History ==
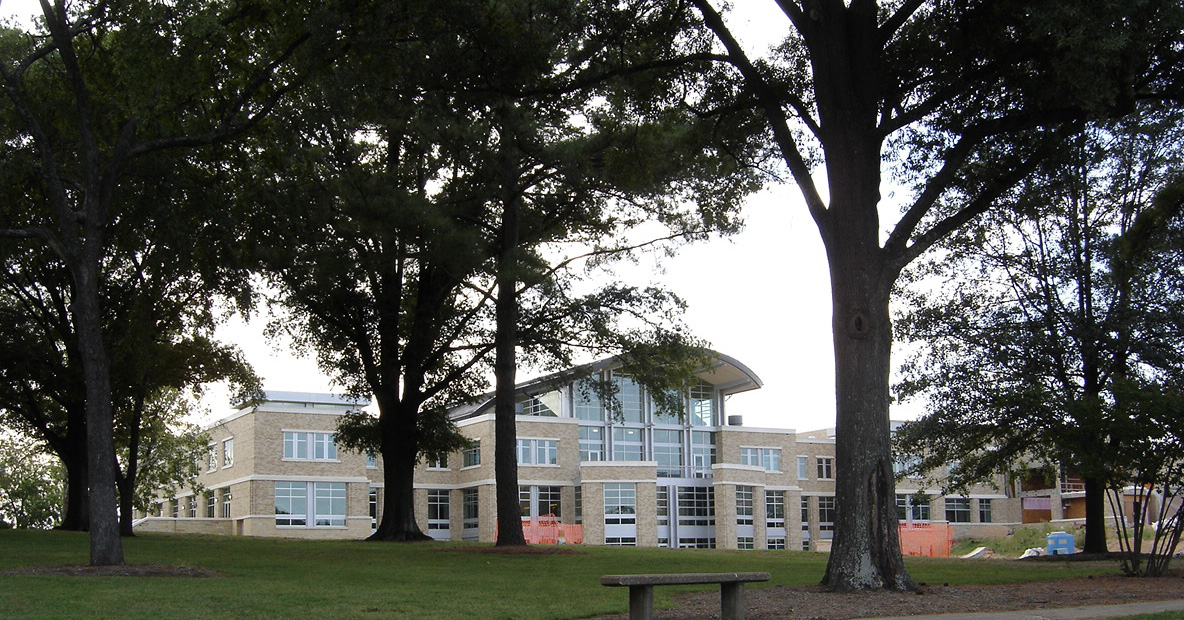
Carl R. Reng Student Union

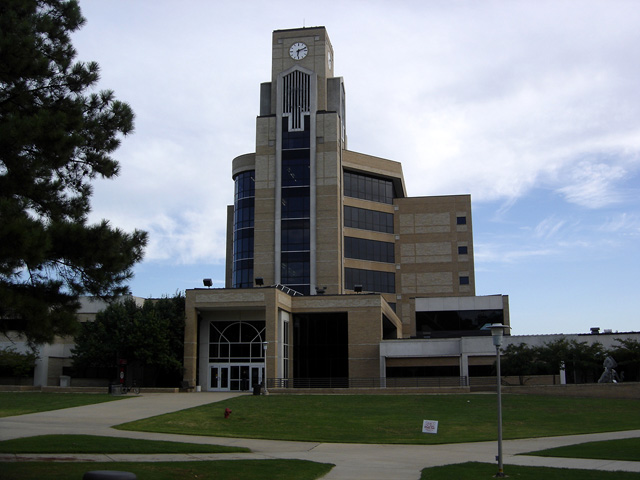
Dean B. Ellis Library.

A-State was founded as the First District Agricultural School in Jonesboro in 1909 by the Arkansas Legislature as a regional agricultural training school. Robert W. Glover, a Missionary Baptist pastor who served in both houses of the Arkansas Legislature from Sheridan (1905–1912), introduced in 1909 the resolution calling for the establishment of four state agricultural colleges, including the future ASU.

In 1918, ASU began offering a two-year college program. In 1925, it became First District Agricultural and Mechanical College. A four-year degree program was begun in 1930. A & M College became Arkansas State College in 1933. In 1967, the Arkansas Legislature elevated the college to university status and changed the name to Arkansas State University.

== Academics ==
Academic rankings

Master's
- Washington Monthly: 134

Regional
- U.S. News & World Report: 61 (South)

National
- U.S. News & World Report: 352 (tie)

The university has more than 100,000 alumni and offers programs at the doctoral, specialist's, master's, bachelor's, and associate degree levels. They are organized into several colleges: Agriculture, Engineering & Computer Science, Business, Education & Behavioral Science, Liberal Arts & Communication, Nursing & Health Professions, Sciences & Mathematics, and Undergraduate Studies.

In 2018, Arkansas State was classified among "R2: Doctoral Universities – High research activity". The university nevertheless maintains a focus on undergraduate instruction and small class sizes, with a student-faculty ratio of 16:1, ranked #76 in undergraduate teaching nationwide as of 2020. The university was ranked #1013 (UniRank 2024–2025), #1119 (SCImago Rankings 2018), and #1645 (URAP Rankings 2020–2021) in the global university rankings.

Master's degree graduate programs were initiated in 1955 and ASU began offering its first doctoral degree, in educational leadership, in the fall of 1992. A second doctoral program, in environmental science, was begun in the fall of 1997 and the doctoral program in heritage studies began in the fall of 2001. Newer doctoral programs are in environmental science, molecular biosciences, and physical therapy. In the fall of 2016, Arkansas State enrolled the first class of approximately 115 students to its branch of the New York Institute of Technology's medical school. The medical school is located on campus in the historic Wilson Hall.

Since the late 2010s, the university has actively expanded degree programs that can be completed entirely online. These online programs have rapidly grown at both the undergraduate and graduate levels. In the 2019 U.S. News & World Report rankings of online education, the university's online bachelor's programs rose to 114th nationally, a significant improvement from 259th place in the previous year. Its online graduate programs were also ranked 115th in the United States. The university's online MBA program was also ranked within the top 15 nationwide in the U.S. News rankings.

== Media ==
A-State's journalism program reorganized into the College of Media and Communication for fall 2013. The College of Media and Communication is home to three student-led media outlets and a NPR affiliate radio station. The Herald, a weekly student newspaper, was founded in 1921 and has a circulation of 5,000. ASU-TV, a program under the Department of Radio-Television, gives students hands-on experience in the field of television broadcasting. Starting in the fall of 2013, an Internet-based student radio station, Red Wolf Radio, was added to the student media. Arkansas State is also home to KASU, a 100,000-watt FM station, which is the oldest NPR affiliate west of the Mississippi River.

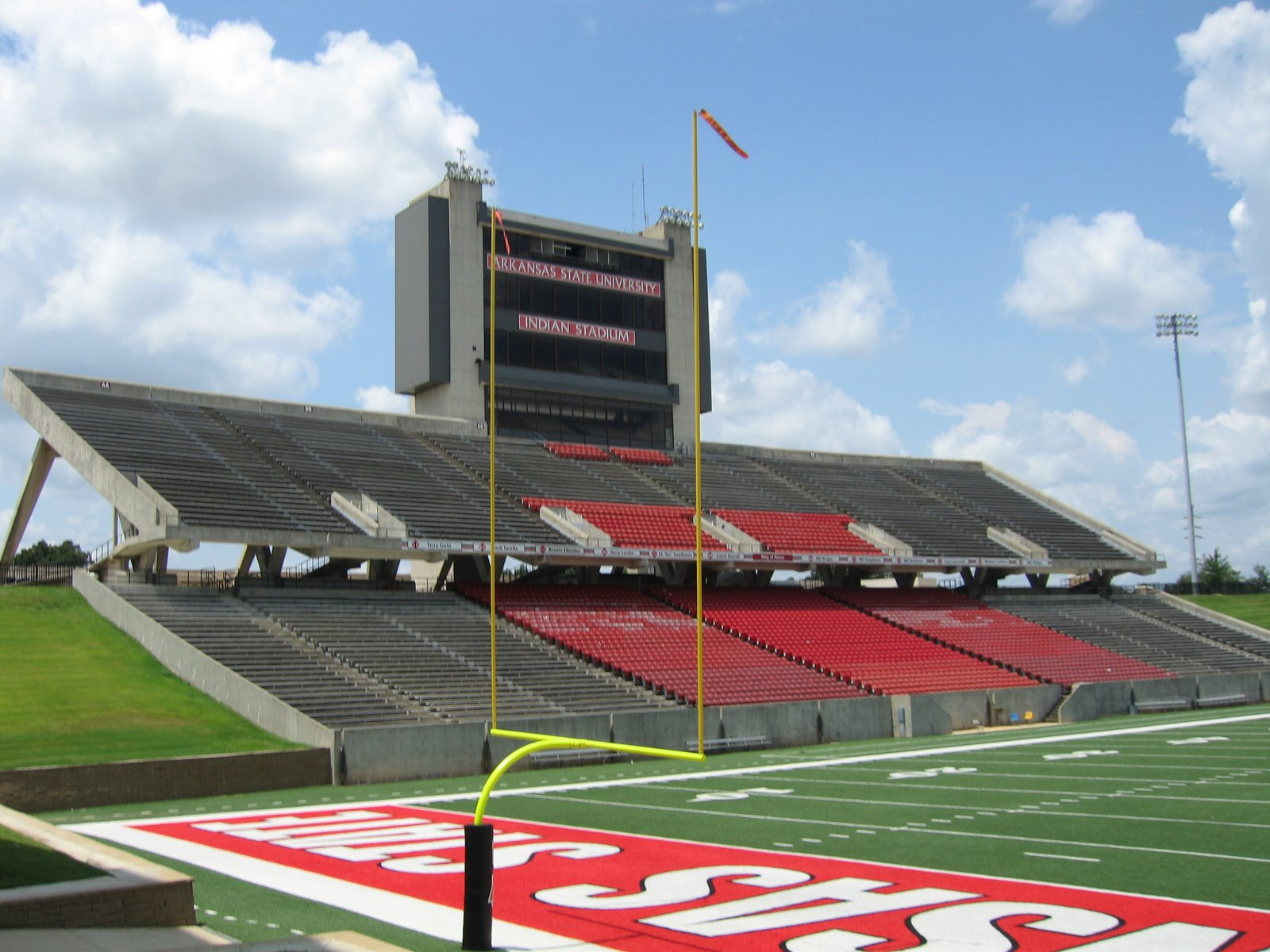
Centennial Bank Stadium (formerly known as Indian Stadium)

== Athletics ==
Arkansas State participates as a member of the NCAA Division I, competing in the Sun Belt Conference. The athletic teams, previously known as the Indians, are now known as the Red Wolves.

In 2012, the Red Wolves football team became Sun Belt Conference champions for a second straight year, finishing the regular season with a 9–3 record, and capped off its successful season with its first bowl game victory since becoming a Division I-A (FBS) program with a 17–13 victory over Kent State in the GoDaddy.com Bowl, as well as earning its first win over a ranked opponent since joining the FBS in 1992.

In 2013, the football team became the Sun Belt Conference champions for a third straight year, finishing with a 7–5 regular season record and won a second consecutive GoDaddy Bowl with a 23–20 victory over then 10-2 Ball State.

Undergraduate demographics as of fall 2023
Race and ethnicity	Total
White	67%
Black	15%
International student	8%
Hispanic	5%
Two or more races	3%
Asian	1%
Unknown	1%
Economic diversity
Low-income (Note: The percentage of students who received an income-based federal Pell grant intended for low-income students.)	40%
Affluent (Note: The percentage of students who are a part of the American middle class at the bare minimum.)	60%

== Notable alumni ==
=== Activism ===
- Julia Butterfly Hill – environmental activist

=== Arts and entertainment ===
- Ronald Heard – professional wrestler known as "Outlaw" Ron Bass
- David Nail – Mercury and MCA Nashville recording artist
- Miller Williams – poet

=== Athletics ===
- Adrian Banks – American-Israeli professional basketball player for Hapoel Tel Aviv of the Israeli Basketball Super League
- Fred Barnett – NFL player
- Earl Bell – Olympic bronze medalist in pole vaulting (1984) and former world record holder
- Darren Benson – NFL player
- Bill Bergey – NFL player
- Gene Bradley – USFL player and NFL draftee
- Ray Brown – NFL player
- Maurice Carthon – NFL player and coach
- Demario Davis – NFL player
- John Dickson- former ABA player
- Patrick Eddie – NBA player
- Carlos Emmons – NFL player
- Brad Franchione – two-time NJCAA National Championship head football coach
- Leroy Harris – NFL player
- Jeff Hartwig – former U.S. record holder in pole vault
- Thomas Hill – Olympic bronze medalist in 110-meter hurdles (1972)
- David Johnson – NFL player
- Tyrell Johnson – NFL player, Minnesota Vikings, Detroit Lions
- Ken Jones – NFL player
- Cleo Lemon – NFL player
- J. D. McKissic – NFL player
- Ron Meeks – NFL and CFL player
- Dennis Meyer – CFL coach
- Jerry Muckensturm – NFL player
- Chris Odom – NFL player
- Jordan Richard – professional bowler; 2023 PWBA Player of the Year; three-time All-American at Arkansas State (2016, 2017, 2018)
- Kyle Richardson – NFL player
- Jerry Rook – former American Basketball Association player
- Elbert Shelley – NFL player
- Kellie Suttle – two-time Olympic pole vaulter and silver medalist at 2001 World Indoor Championships and 1999 Pan American Games
- Corey Williams – NFL player

=== Education ===
- Larry P. Arnn – president, Hillsdale College
- Lonnie D. Bentley – professor and the department head of computer and information technology at Purdue University
- Frederick C. Turner, Jr. – one of first 3 Black students, first Black faculty member at ASU, commander of SHAPE

=== Government ===
- Mike Beebe – governor of Arkansas (2006–2014)
- Ronald R. Caldwell – Arkansas state senator from District 23; real estate businessman in Wynne
- Davy Carter – former speaker of the Arkansas House of Representatives, banker and attorney
- Rick Crawford – U.S. representative for the First District of Arkansas.
- Jeremy Gillam – former speaker of the Arkansas House of Representatives from White County
- Michelle Gray (Class of 1999, B.S. accounting) – Republican member of the Arkansas House of Representatives from Melbourne in Izard County
- Josh Miller – member of the Arkansas House of Representatives from Heber Springs; obtained associate degree from ASU campus in Heber Springs
- Stetson Painter – member of the Arkansas House of Representatives
- Chad Puryear – member of the Arkansas House of Representatives
- Dan A. Sullivan – Republican member of the Arkansas House of Representatives for Craighead and Greene counties since 2015; played basketball for ASU
- Dave Wallace (Class of 1970) – member of the Arkansas House of Representatives from Mississippi County; inductee of the ASU Hall of Heroes for his military service in the Vietnam War

=== Law ===
- D. Price Marshall – federal judge, United States District Court for the Eastern District of Arkansas

=== Military ===
- Robert C. Hinson – U.S. Air Force lieutenant general
- George K. Sisler – posthumous Medal of Honor recipient from Vietnam War

=== Health care ===
- Beth Holloway – speech pathologist and motivational speaker, mother of Natalee Holloway

=== Religious ===
- V. E. Howard – Church of Christ clergyman who started the radio program International Gospel Hour, based originally in Texarkana, Texas
