= Spencer Hawks =

American politician (born 1983)

Member of the Arkansas House of Representatives from the 70th district
- In office 2018–2023
- Preceded by: David Meeks
- Succeeded by: Matt Brown

Personal details
- Born: 1983 (age 42–43) Fort Worth, Texas, U.S.
- Party: Republican
- Spouse: Xochilt Hawks
- Children: 2 Daughters 1 Son
- Education: Central Baptist College
- Occupation: Real Estate Broker

John Spencer Hawks (born 1983) is the former Republican state representative for District 70, which includes portions of Faulkner and Perry counties in central Arkansas.

== Life and career ==
Hawks is a graduate of Greenbrier High School in Greenbrier, Arkansas. He obtained his Bachelor of Business Administration at Central Baptist College in Conway, Arkansas. Hawks served on four committees: (1) Legislative Joint Energy Committee (2) Legislative Joint Audit Committee (3) House City, County, and Local Affairs Committee (4) House Judiciary Committee. Hawks served as the Secretary for the Arkansas Republican House Caucus and the co-chair for the Freshman Caucus. He resides in Conway in Faulkner County.

First elected in 2018, when he replaced the Republican Representative David Meeks, Hawks won reelection to his second legislative term in the general election held on November 6, 2020. With 13,256 votes (100 percent), he did not have an opponent.

Hawks challenged incumbent State Senator Mark Johnson for State Senate in the Arkansas 2022 midterm Republican primary election. The senate district represents parts of Pulaski County and Faulkner County. Hawks lost to Johnson with 45.7% of the 10,271 votes cast.
