= Megan Godfrey =

American politician

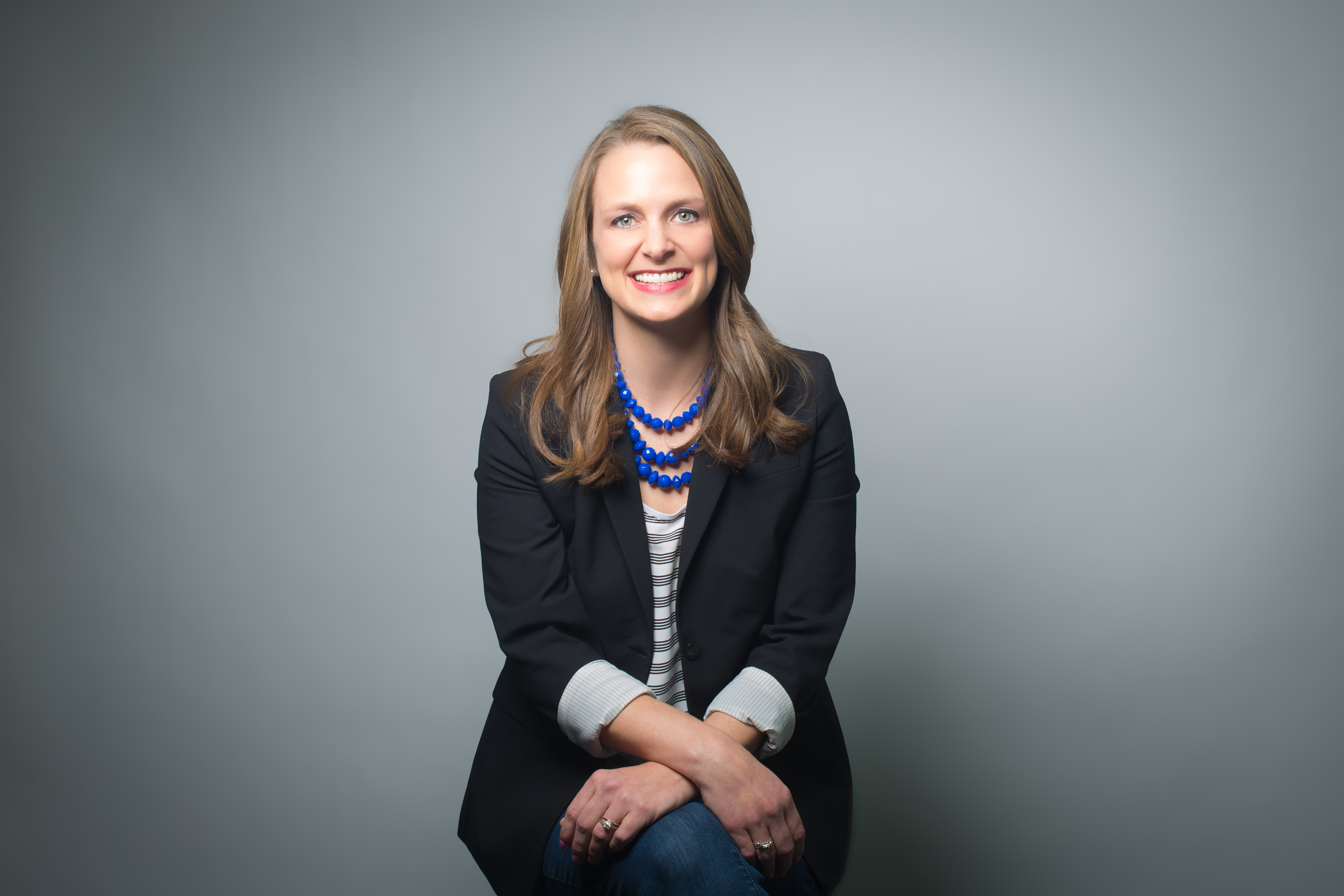

Member of the Arkansas House of Representatives from the 89th district
- In office January 14, 2019 – January 9, 2023
- Preceded by: Jeff Williams

Personal details
- Born: Megan Cardwell; December 5, 1983 (age 42)
- Party: Democrat
- Spouse: Daniel Godfrey (m. 2008)
- Children: Elizabeth "Zuzu", Jude
- Education: University of Arkansas (PhD); Loyola Marymount University (MA); University of Arkansas (BA cum laude)

Megan Cardwell Godfrey (born December 5, 1983) is an American educator and politician who served in the Arkansas House of Representatives from the 89th district from 2019 to 2023. She is a member of the Democratic Party.

== Early life ==
Megan Cardwell was born to parents Cindy and Gary Cardwell on December 5, 1983. The family moved to Springdale, Arkansas when she was 14. After graduating from Springdale High School, Cardwell attended the University of Arkansas in Fayetteville, graduating with a major in Spanish and minor in Latin American studies. She was active in Associated Student Government and was named homecoming queen at the University of Arkansas in 2004.

== Career ==
Cardwell joined Teach for America after graduation and taught in the Los Angeles Unified School District until 2008. During this time, she also earned a master's in early childhood education from Loyola Marymount University.

In 2008, Cardwell married Daniel Godfrey of Springdale and returned to Springdale to raise her family. She worked at Springdale Public Schools as a teacher and ESL curriculum specialist. Springdale is the largest school district in Arkansas and often has the highest proportion of ESL-students in the state, reflecting the diverse demographics of Springdale and the 89th district. After nine years in Springdale, Godfrey took a position with Fayetteville Public Schools as Co-Director of English Language Learning.

== Politics ==
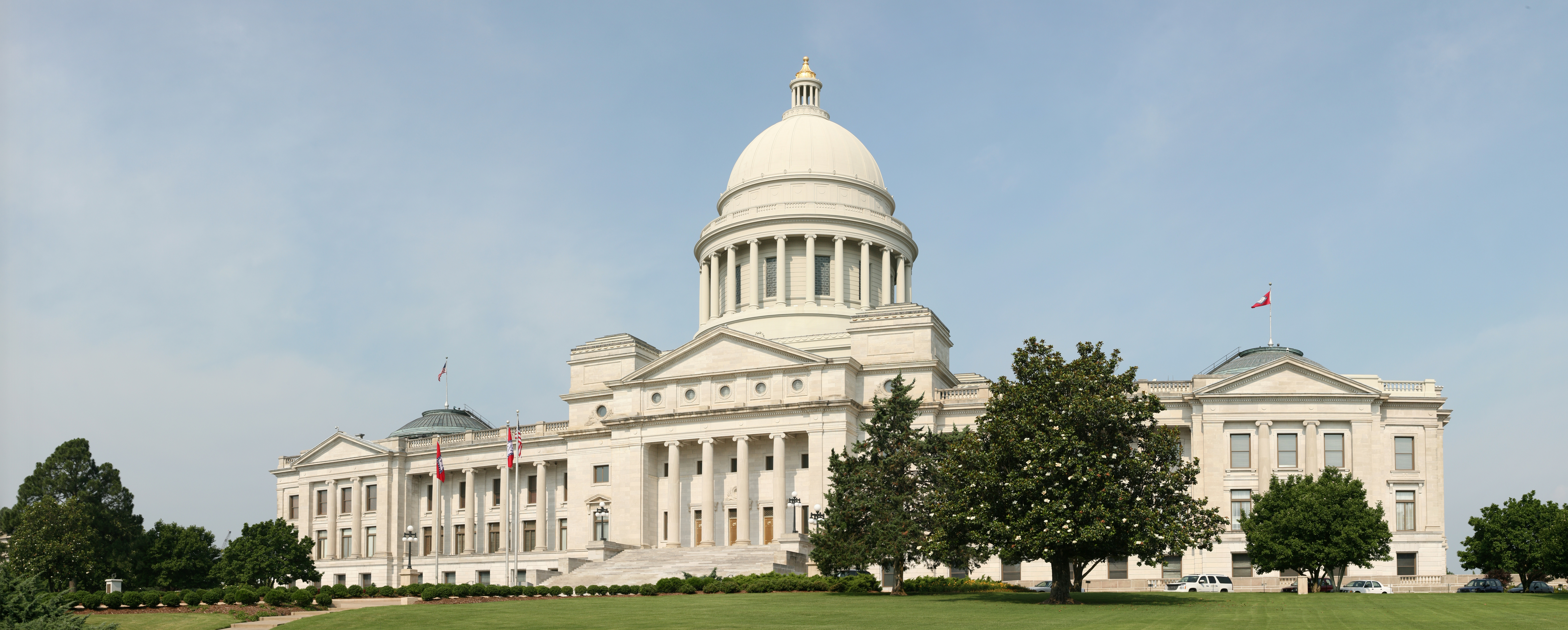
Arkansas State Capitol

In the general election on November 6, 2018, Godfrey narrowly unseated Republican State Rep. Jeff Williams by a final vote of 1,857 to 1,827 (50.5%-49.5%). She was the first Democrat elected to the House from Springdale since Louis McJunkin, who retired in 1999.

As a member of the 92nd Arkansas General Assembly, Godfrey was in the minority as a Democrat. At the start of the session, Republicans had maintained a state government trifecta since 2015. Godfrey's signature legislation in 2019 was lead sponsor of Act 837, which grants nursing licenses to qualified nursing school students with a Deferred Action for Childhood Arrivals (DACA) status.

She announced plans to run for reelection in June 2019. Unopposed in the Democratic primary, Godfrey won a second term in November 2020 against Republican challenger Jed Duggar, a son of former state representative Jim Bob Duggar of 19 Kids and Counting fame.

Following the redistricting of House maps in 2021, Godfrey was drawn into a much more heavily Republican district that did not contain most of the area she already represented. She announced her intention to retire from the House and not run for reelection in 2022.

== See also ==
Political offices
Preceded by Jeff Williams	Arkansas House of Representatives; Representative for 89th District; January 14, 2019 - Present	Succeeded by Incumbent
