= Michelle Gray (politician) =

American state legislator

Michelle Gray is a state legislator in Arkansas. She serves in the Arkansas House of Representatives. She is a Republican. She represents the 62nd District. A graduate of Arkansas State University, she is married to Adam Gray and has five children. She is Baptist. She first served in the House in 2015. She lives in Melbourne, Arkansas.
