= Bill Sample =

American politician

Bill Sample (born April 16, 1946) was a state legislator in Arkansas.

== Career ==
A Republican, he served in the Arkansas Senate between 2011 and 2023, representing Hot Springs, after having served three terms in the Arkansas House of Representatives beginning in 2005. He lives near Village, Arkansas. In 2022, he was narrowly defeated in the Republican primary by county commissioner Matt McKee, who would go on to win the general election.

Sample owned a pest control business. He was a Vice President for the Arkansas Pest Management Association in 2004 after serving as Regional Director in 2002.
