= Jay Richardson (politician) =

American politician

Member of the Arkansas House of Representatives from the 49th district
- Incumbent
- Assumed office January 14, 2019
- Preceded by: George McGill

Personal details
- Born: January 30, 1971 (age 55)
- Party: Democratic

Jay Richardson (born January 30, 1971) is an American politician who has been a member of the Arkansas House of Representatives from the 49th district in Sebastian County since 2019.

== Political career ==
On January 15, 2019, shortly after taking office, Richardson and fellow newcomer state representative Megan Godfrey (D-Springdale), responded to Arkansas Governor Asa Hutchinson's State of the State address by issuing a statement urging him not to go through with his proposed 5.9% tax cuts and instead allocate more taxpayer money for highways and expanding pre-kindergarten education. Speaking for the state Democrats, Richardson also urged Hutchinson to support the Democrats proposal for the creation of a Earned Income Tax Credit (EITC), which the Democrats believe would go further to help working families. He also stated that roads and pre-K education funding should come before top-end tax breaks.

During the 2020 COVID-19 pandemic, Richardson co-sponsored legislation which created a statewide COVID-19 Rainy Day Fund.

=== Elections ===
Richardson was elected unopposed in the general election on November 6, 2018. He also ran unopposed in the 2020 general election as well.
