= Jim Wooten (politician) =

American politician

Member of the Arkansas House of Representatives from the 59th district
- Incumbent
- Assumed office January 9, 2023
- Preceded by: redistricted

Member of the Arkansas House of Representatives from the 45th district
- In office January 14, 2019 – January 8, 2023
- Preceded by: vacant
- Succeeded by: redistricted

Personal details
- Born: James Earl Wooten; September 20, 1941 (age 84) North Little Rock, Arkansas, U.S.
- Party: Republican

James Earl Wooten (born September 20, 1941) is an American politician who has been serving as a member of the Arkansas House of Representatives since 2019. He is a member of the Republican Party. He currently resides in Beebe, Arkansas. He is a member of the Baptist faith.

== Biography ==
Wooten was born on September 20, 1941, in North Little Rock, Arkansas, to Julian Simmons Wooten (1916-1958) and Hazel Marie Lindsey (1914-1994). Julian died when Wooten was 17 due to a coronary occlusion. He is the founder and former owner of Tiger Mart convenience store and fuel stations chain, former trooper for the Arkansas State Police, and former director of the Arkansas Department of Finance and Administration under David Pryor.

== Politics ==
Representative Jeremy Gillam resigned on June 15, 2018, creating a vacancy in the 45th district (parts of Lonoke and White counties) during the remainder of the 91st Arkansas General Assembly. For the 92nd Arkansas General Assembly, party nominees were chosen by convention by August 6, 2018. Wooten won the Republican Party of Arkansas nomination and was the only candidate who filed for election. Wooten returned to the House in 2021 without opposition in the 2020 election.

Following redistricting, Wooten was located in the 59th district, which included part of White County. He defeated Democrat William Alcott and Libertarian Kai Schulz in the 2022 election. Wooten had no opponent in 2024. Wooten has been a vocal opponent of the Arkansas LEARNS Act.

=== 2026 Republican primary ===
Wooten will face Beebe businessman Tony Ferguson II in the March 4, 2026 Republican primary. Wooten's opposition to the Arkansas LEARNS Act has been an important issue in the campaign.
