= Deborah Ferguson =

American politician

Member of the Arkansas House of Representatives
- In office January 14, 2013 – January 13, 2025
- Preceded by: Marshall Wright
- Succeeded by: Lincoln Barnett
- Constituency: 51st district (2013–2023); 63rd district (2023–2025)

Personal details
- Born: Parkin, Arkansas, U.S.
- Party: Democratic
- Education: University of Mississippi; University of Tennessee Health Science Center
- Profession: Dentist
- Website: fergusonforarkansas.com

Deborah Ferguson (born in Parkin, Arkansas) is an American politician who was a Democratic member of the Arkansas House of Representatives from January 14, 2013 to January 13, 2025. Originally representing the 51st district, she began representing the 63rd district in 2023.

== Education ==
Ferguson earned her bachelor's degree in interior design from the University of Mississippi and her DDS from the University of Tennessee Health Science Center.

== Elections ==
- 2012 With District 51 Representative Marshall Wright redistricted to District 49, Ferguson was unopposed for the May 22, 2012 Democratic Primary, and won the November 6, 2012 General election with 6,794 votes (79.2%) against Libertarian candidate Rodger Paxton.
