= John Payton (politician) =

American politician

John Payton is an auto dealer, cattle rancher, and state legislator in Arkansas. He served in the Arkansas House of Representatives from 2013 to 2022, including as Majority Whip. He has since served in the Arkansas Senate. He is a Republican. He is an auto auctioneer and raises cattle. He sponsored a bill criminalizing the presence of adults in a bathroom unless they are the same sex as any minors present.

He is a member of the National Rifle Association of America.
