= Nicole Clowney =

American politician from Arkansas

Member of the Arkansas House of Representatives
- Incumbent
- Assumed office January 14, 2019
- Preceded by: Greg Leding
- Constituency: 86th district (2019‍–‍2023); 21st district (since 2023)

Personal details
- Born: July 10, 1982 (age 44) Oklahoma, U.S.
- Party: Democratic
- Spouse: Steve Clowney
- Education: University of Chicago (BA); Yale Law School (JD)

Nicole Lefrancois Clowney (born July 10, 1982) is an American politician from Arkansas. Since 2019, she has represented a Fayetteville-based district in the Arkansas House of Representatives.

== Political career ==
=== Election ===
Clowney was elected unopposed in the general election on November 6, 2018. Her term began on January 14, 2019.
