= Cindy Crawford (politician) =

American politician

Member of the Arkansas House of Representatives
- Incumbent
- Assumed office January 2019
- Preceded by: Mathew Pitsch
- Constituency: 76th district (2019–2023); 51st district (2023–present)

Personal details
- Party: Republican
- Spouse: Jerry Crawford
- Children: 2

Cindy Crawford is an American politician who has served as a member of the Arkansas House of Representatives since 2019. A Republican, she initially represented the 76th district before being redistricted to the 51st district in 2023.

== Career ==
Crawford was first elected to the Arkansas House of Representatives to represent the 51st district in 2018, defeating Democratic candidate Caleb Hardwell.

In 2021, Crawford authored a bathroom bill requiring public facilities to enforce bathroom use based on assigned sex at birth.
