= Lee Johnson (politician) =

American politician

Member of the Arkansas House of Representatives from the 75th district
- In office January 2019 – January 9, 2023
- Preceded by: Charlotte Vining Douglas
- Succeeded by: Ashley Hudson

Member of the Arkansas House of Representatives from the 47th district
- Incumbent
- Assumed office January 9, 2023
- Preceded by: Craig Christiansen

Personal details
- Born: Greenwood, Arkansas, U.S.
- Party: Republican
- Education: Greenwood High School; Hendrix College (BA); University of Arkansas (MD)
- Profession: Physician

Lee Johnson is an American politician who has served as a member of the Arkansas House of Representatives since January 2019. He currently represents Arkansas' 47th House district. He has also worked on the Greenwood city council.

== Electoral history ==
He was first elected in the 2018 Arkansas House of Representatives election to the 75th district unopposed. He was reelected in the 2020 Arkansas House of Representatives election unopposed. He ran for the 47th district unopposed in the 2022 Arkansas House of Representatives election due to redistricting.

== Biography ==
Johnson earned a Bachelor of Arts from Hendrix College and a Doctor of Medicine from the University of Arkansas for Medical Sciences. Outside of politics, he is a Physician. He was born and raised in Greenwood, Arkansas. He is a graduate of Greenwood High School.
