= Ken Ferguson (politician) =

American politician

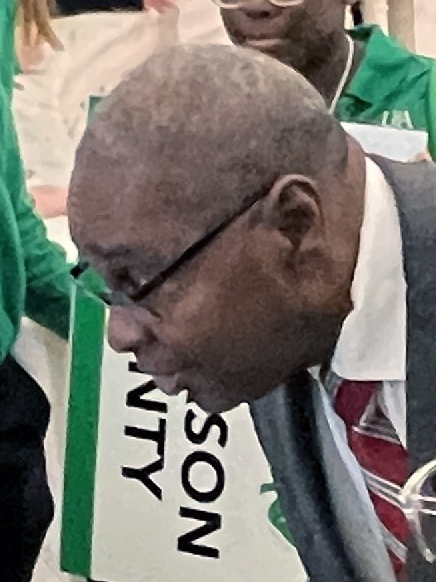
- Ferguson in 2023

Member of the Arkansas House of Representatives from the 16th district
- Incumbent
- Assumed office January 12, 2015
- Preceded by: James Word

Personal details
- Born: Kenneth Ferguson
- Party: Democratic
- Children: 4
- Education: University of Arkansas at Pine Bluff (BS)

Kenneth B. Ferguson is an American politician serving as a member of the Arkansas House of Representatives from the 16th district. Elected in November 2014, he assumed office on January 12, 2015.

== Education ==
Ferguson earned a Bachelor of Science degree in social science from the University of Arkansas at Pine Bluff in 1973.

== Career ==
Ferguson began his career working for the city of Pine Bluff, Arkansas. He also served as executive director of the Arkansas Workforce Board and investment director of the Arkansas Workforce Development Board. In 2021, Ferguson was awarded the Distinguished Legislative Award by the Arkansas Municipal League.
