= Linda Chesterfield =

American politician (born 1947)

Linda Ann Pondexter Chesterfield

Member of the Arkansas Senate from the 12th district (Previously 30th District)
- In office January 14, 2013 – January 13, 2025
- Preceded by: Gilbert Baker
- Succeeded by: Jamie Scott

Member of the Arkansas Senate from the 34th district
- In office January 2011 – January 14, 2013
- Preceded by: Tracy Steele
- Succeeded by: Jane English

Member of the Arkansas House of Representatives from the 36th district
- In office January 2003 – January 2009
- Preceded by: Tommy Roebuck
- Succeeded by: Darrin Williams

Personal details
- Born: September 13, 1947 (age 78) Hope, Arkansas, U.S.
- Party: Democratic
- Education: Hendrix College

Linda Ann Pondexter Chesterfield (born September 13, 1947, in Hope, Arkansas) is an American politician and a former Democratic member of the Arkansas Senate, serving from 2011 to 2025. She represented District 12 and, prior to redistricting, Districts 34 and 30. She previously served in the Arkansas House of Representatives District 36 seat from 2003 to 2009.

== Education ==
Chesterfield graduated from Hendrix College in Conway, Arkansas, in 1965 and was the college's first African-American graduate.

== Elections ==
- 2012 Redistricted to District 30, with Senator Gilbert Baker term limited, Chesterfield was unopposed for both the May 22, 2012 Democratic Primary and the November 6, 2012 General election.
- 2002 Initially in House District 36, when Representative Tommy Roebuck left the Legislature and left the seat open, Chesterfield won the three-way 2002 Democratic Primary (the NIMSP double-lists her in that election as Linda Pondexter) and was unopposed for the November 2002 General election.
- 2004 Chesterfield was unopposed for both the 2004 Democratic Primary and the November 2, 2004 General election.
- 2006 Chesterfield was unopposed for both the 2006 Democratic Primary and the November 7, 2006 General election.
- 2010 With District 34 Senator Tracy Steele running for the House District 39 seat, Chesterfield ran for the open District 5 Senate seat, won the May 18, 2010 Democratic Primary with 4,588 votes (62.4%) and was unopposed for the November 2, 2010 General election.

Chesterfield was the 2015 president of the Arkansas Legislative Black Caucus.
