= Rick Beck =

American politician

Member of the Arkansas House of Representatives from the 43rd district
- Incumbent
- Assumed office January 12, 2015
- Preceded by: Tommy Thompson

Personal details
- Born: June 15, 1956 (age 70) Little Rock, Arkansas, U.S.
- Party: Republican
- Children: 2
- Education: University of Central Arkansas (BS)

Rick C. Beck (born June 15, 1956) is an American politician and engineer serving as a member of the Arkansas House of Representatives from the 43rd district. Elected in November 2014, he assumed office on January 12, 2015.

== Early life and education ==
Beck was born in Little Rock, Arkansas, and raised in Center Ridge, Arkansas. Beck studied engineering at the University of Oklahoma for one year before earning a Bachelor of Science degree in mathematics and computer science from the University of Central Arkansas in 1989.

== Career ==
From 1984 to 1985, Beck worked as an electrical engineer at Tyson Foods. From 1989 to 2021, he was an electrical engineer at Kimberly-Clark. He also owned Rossi Electric and was an adjunct professor at the University of Arkansas Community College at Morrilton. He was elected to the Arkansas House of Representatives in November 2014 and assumed office on January 12, 2015. Since 2019, he has served as chair of the Joint Energy Committee.
