= Matt McKee =

American politician

Member of the Arkansas Senate from the 6th district
- Incumbent
- Assumed office January 9, 2023
- Preceded by: redistricted

Personal details
- Party: Republican

Matt McKee is an American politician. He serves as a Republican member for the 6th district of the Arkansas Senate.

== Life and career ==
McKee was a justice of the peace in Garland County, Arkansas.

In May 2022, McKee defeated Bill Sample in the Republican primary election for the 6th district of the Arkansas Senate. In November 2022, he defeated Courtney McKee in the general election, winning 69 percent of the vote. He assumed office in 2023.

McKee made headlines in 2023 when he asked a transgender pharmacist if she had a penis.
