= Jamie Aleshia Scott =

American politician from Arkansas

Jamie Scott

Member of the Arkansas Senate from the 12th district
- Incumbent
- Assumed office January 13, 2025
- Preceded by: Linda Chesterfield

Member of the Arkansas House of Representatives from the 72nd district
- In office January 9, 2023 – January 13, 2025
- Preceded by: Steve Magie
- Succeeded by: Tracy Steele

Member of the Arkansas House of Representatives from the 37th district
- In office January 14, 2019 – January 9, 2023
- Preceded by: Eddie Armstrong
- Succeeded by: Steve Hollowell

Personal details
- Born: March 7, 1982 (age 44)
- Party: Democratic

Jamie Aleshia Scott (born March 7, 1982) is an American politician who is a Democratic member of the Arkansas Senate, representing the 12th district since 2025. She previously served in the Arkansas House of Representatives from 2019 to 2025.

== Political career ==
=== Election ===
Scott was elected to the 37th district unopposed in the general election on November 6, 2018. Scott was elected to her second term in the house in the 2022 Arkansas House of Representatives election unopposed on November 8, 2022, for the 72nd district.

In 2024 Scott was elected to represent district 12 in the Arkansas Senate.
