= Jimmy Hickey Jr. =

American businessman and politician

Jimmy Hickey

President pro tempore of the Arkansas Senate
- In office January 11, 2021 – January 9, 2023
- Preceded by: Jim Hendren
- Succeeded by: Bart Hester

Member of the Arkansas Senate from the 4th district
- Incumbent
- Assumed office January 14, 2013
- Preceded by: Robert F. Thompson

Personal details
- Born: Milton Jimmy Hickey Jr. November 5, 1966 (age 59) Texarkana, Arkansas, U.S.
- Party: Republican
- Spouse: Denise
- Education: Texas A&M University, Commerce (BBA)

Milton Jimmy Hickey Jr. (born November 5, 1966) is an American businessman in construction and property management as well as a state senator in Arkansas. He serves in the Arkansas Senate. He has served in the state senate since 2013. He lives in Texarkana. He worked as a banker.

Hickey served as Senate president pro tempore during the 93rd Arkansas General Assembly. He is a Republican.

Arkansas Senate
Preceded by Jim Hendren	President pro tempore of the Arkansas Senate; 2021–2023	Succeeded by Bart Hester
