= John Maddox (politician) =

American attorney and politician

Member of the Arkansas House of Representatives from the 20th district
- Incumbent
- Assumed office January 2017
- Preceded by: Nate Bell

Personal details
- Party: Republican
- Education: University of Arkansas (BA, JD)

John Maddox is an American attorney and politician serving as a member of the Arkansas House of Representatives from the 20th district. Elected in November 2016, he assumed office in January 2017.

== Early life and education ==
A native of Mena, Arkansas, Maddox graduated from Mena High School in 1987. He earned a bachelor's degree from the University of Arkansas and a Juris Doctor from the University of Arkansas School of Law.

== Career ==
Since graduating from law school, Maddox has worked as an attorney at Maddox and Maddox. Maddox is a member of the board of directors of the University of Arkansas Rich Mountain. Maddox was elected to the Arkansas House of Representatives in November 2016 and assumed office in January 2017. Maddox also serves as vice chair of the House Insurance and Commerce Committee.
