= Andrew Collins (politician) =

American politician (born 1983)

Minority Leader of the Arkansas House of Representatives
- Incumbent
- Assumed office January 13, 2025
- Preceded by: Tippi McCullough

Member of the Arkansas House of Representatives from the 73rd district
- Incumbent
- Assumed office January 9, 2023
- Preceded by: Mary Bentley

Member of the Arkansas House of Representatives from the 35th district
- In office January 14, 2019 – January 9, 2023
- Preceded by: Clarke Tucker
- Succeeded by: Milton Nicks Jr. (redistricted)

Personal details
- Born: Andrew Joseph Collins III; September 7, 1983 (age 42) Little Rock, Arkansas, U.S.
- Party: Democratic
- Spouse: Meghan Hauer
- Children: 3
- Education: Duke University (BA); Columbia University (JD)

Andrew Joseph Collins III (born September 7, 1983) is an American politician who is a member of the Arkansas House of Representatives representing the 35th district in Pulaski County. Collins is a member of the Democratic Party.

== Political career ==
=== Elections ===
Collins won the Democratic nomination for State Representative on May 22, 2018, defeating Annie Depper, 69 percent to 31 percent.

He was elected in the general election on November 6, 2018, winning 60 percent of the vote over 38 percent for Republican nominee Judith Goodson and 2 percent for Libertarian William J. Barger.

Collins was unopposed for re-election in 2020. Following the 2020 elections, Collins was redistricted to the 73rd district. He won his first election in the 73rd district in the 2022 election, where he received 58.98% of the vote against Republican challenger John Wickliffe. He ran unopposed in the 2024 elections. He was elected as minority leader for the 2025 legislative session.

Arkansas House of Representatives
Preceded by Tippi McCullough	Minority Leader of the Arkansas House of Representatives; 2025–present	Incumbent
