= Carol Dalby =

American politician

Member of the Arkansas House of Representatives from the 100th district (Previously 1st district)
- Incumbent
- Assumed office January 1, 2017
- Preceded by: Prissy Hickerson

Personal details
- Born: 1975 (age 50–51)
- Party: Republican
- Spouse: John
- Children: 2

Carol Dalby serves as the 100th District (previously 1st District) representative for the Arkansas House of Representatives, representing Texarkana.

== Early life ==
She attended Arkansas High School and Ouachita Baptist University for undergraduate degree before earning a Master's from East Texas State University (now Texas A&M). She went on to earn a Juris Doctor from the University of Arkansas School of Law in Fayetteville.

== Career ==
Dalby has served on several boards and commissions, including as president of the Texarkana Arkansas School District board of directors, University of Arkansas Alumni Association, Texarkana Resources for the Disabled, Texarkana Chapter of the Red Cross, and the Texarkana Library Commission.

She was the first woman to chair the House Judiciary Committee. She is also member of the board for Arkansas Women for Education, Women for Texas A&M, Texarkana Regional Center on Aging and Texarkana Friends of UAMS. She has been president of the Texarkana Regional Arts Council/Women for the Arts; President of the Library Commission, and Chair of the local Red Cross.

She has sponsored bills that add domestic violence as grounds for divorce, funding domestic violence shelters, and congratulating the girl's high school bowling team from Texarkana on their state championship victory.

She was awarded the Texarkana Arkansas School District distinguished alumni award in 2019 for her work in the community, including support of the stadium renovation to and construction of a new school.
