= Bart Hester =

American politician

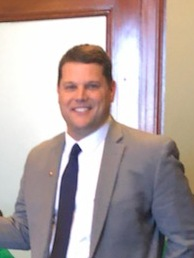
- Hester in 2019

President pro tempore of the Arkansas Senate
- Incumbent
- Assumed office January 9, 2023
- Preceded by: Jimmy Hickey

Member of the Arkansas Senate
- Incumbent
- Assumed office January 14, 2013
- Preceded by: Redistricted
- Constituency: 1st district (2013–2023); 33rd district (2023–present)

Personal details
- Born: Bart Franklin Hester; December 9, 1977 (age 48) Cave Springs, Arkansas, U.S.
- Party: Republican
- Children: 4
- Education: University of Arkansas (BS)

Bart Franklin Hester (born December 9, 1977) is an American politician serving as a member of the Arkansas Senate from the 33rd district and a Republican. A real estate agent and former baseball player, has served since 2013, and was nominated president pro tempore of the Senate for the 94th Arkansas General Assembly.

== Early life and education ==
A native of Conway, Arkansas, Hester graduated from Green Forest High School and earned a Bachelor of Science degree in business management from the Sam M. Walton College of Business at the University of Arkansas. For three years, Hester played on the Arkansas Razorbacks baseball team.

== Career ==
Since 2005, Hester has worked as a real estate agent. He was elected to the Arkansas Senate in November 2012 and assumed office on January 14, 2013. From 2013 to 2015, Hester served as vice chair of the House Children and Youth Committee. During the 2017 legislative session, he served as chair of the House Public Retirement and Social Security Programs Committee. Since 2021, Hester has served as chair of the House Senate Efficiency Committee. Hester has also served as majority leader of the Senate. In 2022, Hester was chosen as President Pro Tempore for the 2023 session.

On May 1st, 2024, Hester accused former Arkansas gubernatorial candidate Chris Jones of taking a “Pro Hamas Terrorist” position. Jones sued Hester for defamation, but dropped the lawsuit in 2025.

In 2025, after the University of Arkansas hired law professor Emily Suski as the dean of its law school, Hester led a group of legislators in threatening to withhold the university's funding after it was revealed that Suski had submitted an amicus bief to the United States Supreme Court in support of allowing transgender female athletes to compete in the same competitions as cisgender women. This led to Suski's offer being rescinded.

Arkansas Senate
Preceded by Jimmy Hickey	President pro tempore of the Arkansas Senate; 2023–present	Incumbent
