= Jim Dotson =

American politician

Member of the Arkansas Senate from the 34th district
- Incumbent
- Assumed office January 9, 2023
- Preceded by: redistricted

Member of the Arkansas House of Representatives from the 93rd district
- In office January 14, 2013 – January 9, 2023
- Preceded by: redistricted
- Succeeded by: redistricted

Personal details
- Born: 1977 or 1978 (age 47–48) Bentonville, Arkansas, U.S.
- Party: Republican
- Spouse: Jennifer Dotson
- Children: 3
- Education: Northwest Arkansas Community College

Jim Dotson (born 1977/1978) is an American politician. He has represented part of Benton County, Arkansas in the Arkansas Senate since 2023. Previously, he represented a similar constituency in the Arkansas House of Representatives from 2013 to 2023.

Dotson was born in Bentonville, Arkansas, and attended Northwest Arkansas Community College. In 2013, he was elected for the 93rd district of the Arkansas House of Representatives, assuming office on January 14, 2013. In 2014, Dotson began working as a real estate agent at Gibson Real Estate.

In 2022 he was elected for the 34th district of the Arkansas Senate, defeating Peter Christie, mayor of Bella Vista, Arkansas, in the Republican primary, and Libertarian Jean Pierre DeVilliers in the general election.
