= Robin Lundstrum =

American politician

Member of the Arkansas House of Representatives from the 18th district
- Incumbent
- Assumed office January 2015

Personal details
- Party: GOP

Robin Lundstrum is a state legislator in Arkansas who serves in the Arkansas House of Representatives. She is a Republican. She lives in Springdale, Arkansas and represents the 18th district. She began serving in the Arkansas House in January 2015.

== Electoral history ==
2022 General Election
Party	Candidate	Votes	%	±
GOP	Robin Lundstrum (Inc.) (R)	6,398	62.3	-11.3%
Democratic	Monique Jones (D)	3,867	37.7	+11.3%

2020 General Election
Party	Candidate	Votes	%	±
GOP	Robin Lundstrum (Inc.)	10,496	72.6	+3.3
Democratic	Michael Bennett-Spears	3,759	26.4	-3.3

2018 General Election
Party	Candidate	Votes	%	±
GOP	Robin Lundstrum (Inc.)	6,660	70.3	-29.7
Democratic	Kelly Unger	2,815	29.7	+29.7

2018 General Election
Party	Candidate	Votes	%	±
GOP	Robin Lundstrum (Inc.)	Unopposed	100	

2014 Republican Primary Election
Party	Candidate	Votes	%	±
GOP	Robin Lundstrum	1,588	57.5	
GOP	Lucas Roebuck	1,176	42.5	
