= Steve Magie =

American politician

Stephen Magie

Member of the Arkansas House of Representatives from the 72nd district
- Incumbent
- Assumed office January 14, 2013
- Preceded by: James McLean

Personal details
- Born: August 21, 1953 (age 73) Little Rock, Arkansas, U.S.
- Party: Democratic
- Education: Morrilton High School; University of Central Arkansas; Louisiana State University; University of Arkansas for Medical Sciences
- Profession: Ophthalmologist
- Website: stevemagie.net

Stephen 'Steve' Magie (born August 21, 1953) is an American politician, ophthalmologist and businessman from the state of Arkansas. He is a Democratic member of the Arkansas House of Representatives representing District 72, which includes a portion of Faulkner County.

== Education ==
Magie graduated from the University of Arkansas for Medical Sciences in 1980, followed by a general-medicine internship at the University of Tennessee in Memphis. He completed his Ophthalmology residency through Louisiana State University before completing a Retina fellowship at Touro Infirmary in New Orleans, Louisiana.

== Business career ==
Magie currently practices ophthalmology at MSC Eye Associates, PA in Conway. where he focuses on retinal related disease including macular degeneration, diabetic retinopathy and retinal surgery.

He is a member and past chairman of the Arkansas Medical Society. He is also a member of the American Medical Association, the Conway Downtown Partnership, the Conway Municipal Airport Advisory Committee, the Faulkner County Medical Society, the Pulaski County Medical Society, and the Conway Morning Optimist Club.

== Political career ==
=== 2014 election ===
Magie announced his re-election campaign on September 3, 2014. He was unopposed in the Democratic Primary and won the general election with 3,794 votes (56.37%) against Republican nominee Shannon Taylor.

=== 2012 election ===
Magie announced his candidacy on August 18, 2011. Redistricted to District 72, with incumbent Representative James McLean redistricted to District 63, Magie was unopposed for the May 22, 2012, Democratic Primary, and won the November 6, 2012, general election with 5,185 votes (59.6%) against Republican nominee Rocky Lawrence.

=== 2010 election ===
Initially in District 46, when Representative Robbie Wills left the Legislature and left the seat open, Magie was unopposed for the May 18, 2010, Democratic Primary, but lost the November 2, 2010, general election to Republican nominee David Meeks.

== Personal life ==
The son of Dr. J.J. Magie of Morrilton and the late Margaret Magie, Magie grew up seeing his dad practice medicine – in family practice, as a general surgeon, then as an ophthalmologist.

Magie is married to Becky Magie and has four children, ten grandchildren and one great-grandchild. He attends St Joseph Catholic Church in Conway.
