= Mark Johnson (Arkansas politician) =

American politician

Member of the Arkansas Senate from the 15th district (Previously 17th District)
- Incumbent
- Assumed office January 14, 2019
- Preceded by: David J. Sanders

Personal details
- Party: Republican
- Spouse: Catherine Johnson
- Children: Alison, Andrea
- Parent(s): James D. Johnson, Virginia Johnson
- Education: Hendrix College

Mark Johnson is an American politician currently serving in the Arkansas Senate from the 15th district. He won the seat unanimously after no other candidate ran against him. He won his primary and will face Democrat David Barber in the general election in his bid for a second term.

== Ethics violation ==
During the 93rd Arkansas General Assembly, Senators Mark Johnson (R-15th) and Alan Clark (R-13th) were punished for violating Senate Ethics rules on July 21, 2022. Johnson signed a sign-in sheet for Clark during a meeting he did not attend, and subsequently requested reimbursement. Both were also stripped of committee leadership posts.
