= Tippi McCullough =

American politician from Arkansas

Minority Leader of the Arkansas House of Representatives
- In office January 11, 2021 – January 13, 2025
- Preceded by: Fredrick Love
- Succeeded by: Andrew Collins

Member of the Arkansas House of Representatives from the 33rd district
- Incumbent
- Assumed office January 14, 2019
- Preceded by: Warwick Sabin

Personal details
- Born: October 1963 (age 62)
- Party: Democratic
- Spouse: Barbara Mariani
- Education: National Park College (AS); Ouachita Baptist University (BS); Henderson State University (MS)

Tippi Lynn McCullough (born October 1963) is an American politician who is a member of the Arkansas House of Representatives from the 33rd district in Pulaski County.

== Background ==
McCullough was raised by her mother in Hot Springs, Arkansas, where she graduated from Lake Hamilton High School in 1981. McCullough received her associate degree in physical education from Garland County Community College. She then completed her bachelor's degree at Ouachita Baptist University in Arkadelphia, Arkansas, on a basketball scholarship as a first-generation college student. After graduating with a B.S.E. in physical education and English, McCullough received an M.S.E. in English from Henderson State University in Arkadelphia, Arkansas. She taught English and basketball at Kingston High School in Madison County, Arkansas, and later at Mountain Pine High School in Garland County, Arkansas. McCullough is the first woman to become president of the Arkansas Basketball Coaches Association.

In January 2014, McCullough began teaching English at Little Rock Central High School after she was fired from her job of 14 years as a teacher at Mount St. Mary Academy in 2013 after marrying her partner Barbara Mariani. Although her relationship with Mariani was well-known of at Mount St. Mary, the school stated that McCullough's marriage violated a morality clause in their contract. This experience encouraged McCullough to become more involved with politics; in 2014, she became president of the Stonewall Democrats where she became more familiar with Arkansan Democratic politics.

== 2018 campaign ==
McCullough, a Democrat, ran as the 33rd District Representative in the Arkansas House of Representatives. The seat was previously filled by Warwick Sabin who ran for mayor of Little Rock. Her opponent in the primaries was fellow Democrat Ross Noland, an attorney and non-profit director at the Buffalo River Foundation.

McCullough's primary policy focus during her campaign was education. Her almost two-decade-long experience as a teacher had exposed her to the '"struggles'" of students, "whether it was because they were homeless or hungry or suffering abuse." Her involvement with the Arkansas Education Association had opened her eyes to other issues in the educational system as well. McCullough also objected the unchecked expansion of charter schools and supported more funding for public schools and teachers.

Aside from education, McCullough supported the preservation of War Memorial Park as a green space and opposed Governor Asa Hutchinson's tax cuts on wealthy residents.

McCullough was elected unopposed in the general election on November 6, 2018, after defeating Noland in the May primaries.

== Political career ==
McCullough is currently serving her first term in the Arkansas House as the representative from District 33, which represents portions of Pulaski County. She serves on the House Revenue and Taxation Committee and the House Aging, Children and Youth, Legislative and Military Affairs Committee.

Arkansas House of Representatives
Preceded by Fredrick Love	Minority Leader of the Arkansas House of Representatives; 2021–2025	Succeeded by Andrew Collins
