= Dan Sullivan (Arkansas politician) =

American politician

Member of the Arkansas Senate from the 20th district (Previously 21st district)
- Incumbent
- Assumed office January 11, 2021
- Preceded by: John Cooper

Member of the Arkansas House of Representatives from the 53rd district
- In office January 12, 2015 – January 11, 2021
- Preceded by: Homer Lenderman
- Succeeded by: Jon Milligan

Personal details
- Party: Republican
- Spouse: Maria
- Children: 2
- Education: Arkansas State University (BSE); Truman State University (MSE)

Dan Sullivan is an American politician serving as a member of the Arkansas Senate from the 20th district. He has served in the Arkansas General Assembly since 2015.

== Education ==
Sullivan earned a Bachelor of Science in Education from Arkansas State University and a Master of Science in Education from Truman State University.

== Career ==
Prior to entering politics, Sullivan worked as an employee of the Behavioral Health Providers Association and CEO of Ascent Children's Health Services. He has mentioned on his social media how he worked as a coach for the Central High School Tigers of Caraway Arkansas. He also represented the 53rd district in the Arkansas House of Representatives from 2015 to 2021. Sullivan was elected to the Arkansas Senate in November 2020 and assumed office on January 11, 2021.

=== Caucus memberships ===
- Senate Taiwan Caucus

== Controversies ==
In 2017, the preschool that Dan Sullivan was CEO of, Ascent Children’s Health Services, fell under fire after the death of a five year old boy.

In 2023, Dan Sullivan introduced a bill which would become Arkansas Act 372, which concerned libraries and access to information for minors. This law and lawsuit garnered national attention.
