= 2024 Arkansas House of Representatives election =

- November 5, 2024

All 100 seats in the Arkansas House of Representatives 51 seats needed for a majority
	Majority party	Minority party
Leader	Matthew Shepherd	Tippi McCullough
Party	Republican	Democratic
Leader since	June 15, 2018	2021
Leader's seat	97th	74th
Last election	82	18
Seats won	81	19
Seat change	▼1	▲1
Popular vote	760,692	299,448
Percentage	70.74%	27.85%
Swing	▼0.83%	▲4.36%
- Democratic gain Republican hold Democratic hold 50–60% 60–70% 70–80% 80–90% >90% 50–60% 60–70% 70–80% >90%
Speaker before election
Matthew Shepherd
Republican
Elected Speaker
Matthew Shepherd
Republican

The 2024 Arkansas House of Representatives election was held on November 5, 2024, alongside the 2024 United States elections.

== Partisan background ==
In the 2020 Presidential Election, Republican Donald Trump won 81 of Arkansas' House districts, while Democrat Joe Biden won 19. Going into the 2024 Arkansas House Election, Democrats held one Trump-won district: District 56 in Conway (Trump +4%). Republicans held one Biden-won district: District 62, a majority African-American region in the Delta (Biden +7%).

2020 Presidential data by House district: Trump: 40–50% 50–60%; 60–70%; 70–80%; 80–90%; Biden: 50–60%; 60–70%; 70–80%; 80–90%

== Background ==
The primary elections were held on March 5, 2024. Early voting began on February 20.

== Retirements ==
12 incumbents retired.

=== Republicans ===
Eight Republicans are retiring.

1. District 4: Jack Fortner retired.
2. District 14: Grant Hodges retired.
3. District 17: Delia Haak retired.
4. District 24: Charlene Fite retired.
5. District 26: Mark H. Berry retired.
6. District 41: Josh Miller retired.
7. District 83: Lanny Fite retired.
8. District 88: Danny Watson retired.

=== Democrats ===
Four Democrats are retiring.

1. District 35: Milton Nicks Jr. retired.
2. District 63: Deborah Ferguson retired.
3. District 65: Vivian Flowers retired to run for mayor of Pine Bluff.
4. District 72: Jamie Aleshia Scott retired to run for State Senate.

== Incumbents defeated ==
=== General election ===
- District 9: Republican DeAnna Hodges was defeated by Democrat Diana Gonzales Worthen

== Predictions ==
Source	Ranking	As of
CNalysis	Solid R	March 16, 2024

== Summary of results ==
Italics denote an open seat held by the incumbent party; bold text denotes a gain for a party.

State House District	Incumbent	Party	Elected Representative	Outcome
1	Jeremy Wooldridge	Rep	Jeremy Wooldridge	Rep Hold
2	Trey Steimel	Rep	Trey Steimel	Rep Hold
3	Stetson Painter	Rep	Stetson Painter	Rep Hold
4	Jack Fortner	Rep	Jason Nazarenko	Rep Hold
5	Ron McNair	Rep	Ron McNair	Rep Hold
6	Harlan Breaux	Rep	Harlan Breaux	Rep Hold
7	Brit McKenzie	Rep	Brit McKenzie	Rep Hold
8	Austin McCollum	Rep	Austin McCollum	Rep Hold
9	DeAnna Hodges	Rep	**Diana Gonzales Worthen**	**Dem Gain**
10	Mindy McAlindon	Rep	Mindy McAlindon	Rep Hold
11	Rebecca Burkes	Rep	Rebecca Burkes	Rep Hold
12	Hope Hendren Duke	Rep	Hope Hendren Duke	Rep Hold
13	R. Scott Richardson	Rep	R. Scott Richardson	Rep Hold
14	Grant Hodges	Rep	Nick Burkes	Rep Hold
15	John P. Carr	Rep	John P. Carr	Rep Hold
16	Kendon Underwood	Rep	Kendon Underwood	Rep Hold
17	Delia Haak	Rep	Randy Torres	Rep Hold
18	Robin Lundstrum	Rep	Robin Lundstrum	Rep Hold
19	Steve Unger	Rep	Steve Unger	Rep Hold
20	Denise Garner	Dem	Denise Garner	Dem Hold
21	Nicole Clowney	Dem	Nicole Clowney	Dem Hold
22	David Whitaker	Dem	David Whitaker	Dem Hold
23	Kendra Moore	Rep	Kendra Moore	Rep Hold
24	Charlene Fite	Rep	Brad Hall	Rep Hold
25	Chad Puryear	Rep	Chad Puryear	Rep Hold
26	Mark H. Berry	Rep	James Eaton	Rep Hold
27	Steven Walker	Rep	Steven Walker	Rep Hold
28	Bart Schulz	Rep	Bart Schulz	Rep Hold
29	Rick McClure	Rep	Rick McClure	Rep Hold
30	Frances "Fran" Cavenaugh	Rep	Frances "Fran" Cavenaugh	Rep Hold
31	Jimmy Gazaway	Rep	Jimmy Gazaway	Rep Hold
32	Jack Ladyman	Rep	Jack Ladyman	Rep Hold
33	Jon Milligan	Rep	Jon Milligan	Rep Hold
34	Joey L. Carr	Rep	Joey L. Carr	Rep Hold
35	Milton Nicks Jr.	Dem	Jessie McGruder	Dem Hold
36	Johnny Rye	Rep	Johnny Rye	Rep Hold
37	Steve Hollowell	Rep	Steve Hollowell	Rep Hold
38	Dwight Tosh	Rep	Dwight Tosh	Rep Hold
39	Wayne Long	Rep	Wayne Long	Rep Hold
40	Shad Pearce	Rep	Shad Pearce	Rep Hold
41	Josh Miller	Rep	Alyssa Brown	Rep Hold
42	Stephen Meeks	Rep	Stephen Meeks	Rep Hold
43	Rick Beck	Rep	Rick Beck	Rep Hold
44	Stan Berry	Rep	Stan Berry	Rep Hold
45	Aaron Pilkington	Rep	Aaron Pilkington	Rep Hold
46	Jon S. Eubanks	Rep	Jon S. Eubanks	Rep Hold
47	Lee Johnson	Rep	Lee Johnson	Rep Hold
48	Ryan Rose	Rep	Ryan Rose	Rep Hold
49	Jay Richardson	Dem	Jay Richardson	Dem Hold
50	Zachary Gramlich	Rep	Zachary Gramlich	Rep Hold
51	Cindy Crawford	Rep	Cindy Crawford	Rep Hold
52	Marcus Richmond	Rep	Marcus Richmond	Rep Hold
53	Matt Duffield	Rep	Matt Duffield	Rep Hold
54	Mary Bentley	Rep	Mary Bentley	Rep Hold
55	Matthew Brown	Rep	Matthew Brown	Rep Hold
56	Steve Magie	Dem	Steve Magie	Dem Hold
57	Cameron Cooper	Rep	Cameron Cooper	Rep Hold
58	Les Eaves	Rep	Les Eaves	Rep Hold
59	Jim Wooten	Rep	Jim Wooten	Rep Hold
60	Roger Lynch	Rep	Roger Lynch	Rep Hold
61	Jeremiah Moore	Rep	Jeremiah Moore	Rep Hold
62	Mark McElroy	Rep	Mark McElroy	Rep Hold
63	Deborah Ferguson	Dem	Lincoln Barnett	Dem Hold
64	Ken Ferguson	Dem	Ken Ferguson	Dem Hold
65	Vivian Flowers	Dem	Glenn Barnes	Dem Hold
66	Mark Perry	Dem	Mark Perry	Dem Hold
67	Karilyn Brown	Rep	Karilyn Brown	Rep Hold
68	Brian S. Evans	Rep	Brian S. Evans	Rep Hold
69	David Ray	Rep	David Ray	Rep Hold
70	Carlton Wing	Rep	Carlton Wing	Rep Hold
71	Brandon Achor	Rep	Brandon Achor	Rep Hold
72	Jamie Aleshia Scott	Dem	Tracy Steele	Dem Hold
73	Andrew Collins	Dem	Andrew Collins	Dem Hold
74	Tippi McCullough	Dem	Tippi McCullough	Dem Hold
75	Ashley Hudson	Dem	Ashley Hudson	Dem Hold
76	Joy C. Springer	Dem	Joy C. Springer	Dem Hold
77	Fred Allen	Dem	Fred Allen	Dem Hold
78	Keith Brooks	Rep	Keith Brooks	Rep Hold
79	Tara Shephard	Dem	Tara Shephard	Dem Hold
80	Denise Ennett	Dem	Denise Ennett	Dem Hold
81	R. J. Hawk	Rep	R. J. Hawk	Rep Hold
82	Tony Furman	Rep	Tony Furman	Rep Hold
83	Lanny Fite	Rep	Paul Childress	Rep Hold
84	Les Warren	Rep	Les Warren	Rep Hold
85	Richard McGrew	Rep	Richard McGrew	Rep Hold
86	John Maddox	Rep	John Maddox	Rep Hold
87	DeAnn Vaught	Rep	DeAnn Vaught	Rep Hold
88	Danny Watson	Rep	Dolly Henley	Rep Hold
89	Justin Gonzales	Rep	Justin Gonzales	Rep Hold
90	Richard Womack	Rep	Richard Womack	Rep Hold
91	Bruce Cozart	Rep	Bruce Cozart	Rep Hold
92	Julie Mayberry	Rep	Julie Mayberry	Rep Hold
93	Mike Holcomb	Rep	Mike Holcomb	Rep Hold
94	Jeff Wardlaw	Rep	Jeff Wardlaw	Rep Hold
95	Howard Beaty	Rep	Howard Beaty	Rep Hold
96	Sonia Eubanks Barker	Rep	Sonia Eubanks Barker	Rep Hold
97	Matthew Shepherd	Rep	Matthew Shepherd	Rep Hold
98	Wade Andrews	Rep	Wade Andrews	Rep Hold
99	Lane Jean	Rep	Lane Jean	Rep Hold
100	Carol Dalby	Rep	Carol Dalby	Rep Hold

== Results ==
District 1 • District 2 • District 3 • District 4 • District 5 • District 6 • District 7 • District 8 • District 9 • District 10 • District 11 • District 12 • District 13 • District 14 • District 15 • District 16 • District 17 • District 18 • District 19 • District 20 • District 21 • District 22 • District 23 • District 24 • District 25 • District 26 • District 27 • District 28 • District 29 • District 30 • District 31 • District 32 • District 33 • District 34 • District 35 • District 36 • District 37 • District 38 • District 39 • District 40 • District 41 • District 42 • District 43 • District 44 • District 45 • District 46 • District 47 • District 48 • District 49 • District 50 • District 51 • District 52 • District 53 • District 54 • District 55 • District 56 • District 57 • District 58 • District 59 • District 60 • District 61 • District 62 • District 63 • District 64 • District 65 • District 66 • District 67 • District 68 • District 69 • District 70 • District 71 • District 72 • District 73 • District 74 • District 75 • District 76 • District 77 • District 78 • District 79 • District 80 • District 81 • District 82 • District 83 • District 84 • District 85 • District 86 • District 87 • District 88 • District 89 • District 90 • District 91 • District 92 • District 93 • District 94 • District 95 • District 96 • District 97 • District 98 • District 99 • District 100

=== Overall ===
Parties	Votes	%	Seats	+/-
Republican	760,692	70.74%	81	▼1
Democratic	299,448	27.85%	19	▲1
Libertarian	15,180	1.41%	0	Steady

=== Closest races ===
Seats where the margin of victory was under 10%:

1. District 35, 1.3%
2. District 70, 1.94%
3. District 67, 4.46%
4. District 62, 7.3%
5. District 56, 7.64%
6. District 63, 9.66%
7. District 75, 9.7%
8. District 9, 9.78% (gain)

=== District 1 ===
Incumbent Republican Jeremy Wooldridge has represented the 1st district since 2023.

Arkansas House of Representatives 1st district Republican primary election, 2024
Party	Candidate	Votes	%
Republican	Jeremy Wooldridge	Unopposed	
Total votes			

Arkansas' 1st House District general election, 2024
Party	Candidate	Votes	%
Republican	Jeremy Wooldridge	9,993	100%
Total votes		9,993	100%

=== District 2 ===
Incumbent Republican Trey Steimel has represented the 2nd district since 2023.

Arkansas House of Representatives 2nd district Republican primary election, 2024
Party	Candidate	Votes	%
Republican	Trey Steimel (incumbent)	Unopposed	
Total votes			

Arkansas' 2nd House District general election, 2024
Party	Candidate	Votes	%
Republican	Trey Steimel	10,733	100%
Total votes		10,733	100%

=== District 3 ===
Incumbent Republican Stetson Painter has represented the 3rd district since 2023.

Arkansas House of Representatives 3rd district Republican primary election, 2024
Party	Candidate	Votes	%
Republican	Stetson Painter (incumbent)	Unopposed	
Total votes			

Arkansas' 3rd House District general election, 2024
Party	Candidate	Votes	%
Republican	Stetson Painter	13,378	100%
Total votes		13,378	100%

=== District 4 ===
Incumbent Republican Jack Fortner, who has represented the 4th district since 2023, is retiring. He previously the represented the 99th district between 2017 and 2023.

Arkansas House of Representatives 4th district Republican primary election, 2024
Party	Candidate	Votes	%
Republican	Jason Nazarenko	3,427	71.32%
Republican	Tink Albright	1,378	28.68%
Total votes		4,805	100.00%

Arkansas' 4th House District general election, 2024
Party	Candidate	Votes	%
Republican	Jason Nazarenko	12,337	100%
Total votes		12,337	100%

=== District 5 ===
Incumbent Republican Ron McNair has represented the 5th district since 2023. He previously represented the 98th district between 2015 and 2023.

Arkansas' 5th House District general election, 2024
Party	Candidate	Votes	%
Republican	Ron McNair (incumbent)	12,382	100%
Total votes		12,382	100%

=== District 6 ===
Incumbent Republican Harlan Breaux has represented the 6th district since 2023. He previously represented the 97th district between 2019 and 2023.

Arkansas House of Representatives 6th district Republican primary election, 2024
Party	Candidate	Votes	%
Republican	Harlan Breaux (incumbent)	Unopposed	
Total votes			

Arkansas House of Representatives 6th district Democratic primary election, 2024
Party	Candidate	Votes	%
Democratic	Rick Delaney	Unopposed	
Total votes			

Arkansas House of Representatives 6th district general election, 2024
Party	Candidate	Votes	%
Republican	Harlan Breaux	8,483	66.18%
Democratic	Rick Delaney	3,724	29.05%
Libertarian	Dakota Logan	611	4.77%
Total votes		12,818	100%

=== District 7 ===
Incumbent Republican Brit McKenzie has represented the 7th district since 2023.

Arkansas House of Representatives 7th district Republican primary election, 2024
Party	Candidate	Votes	%
Republican	Brit McKenzie (incumbent)	Unopposed	
Total votes			

Arkansas House of Representatives 7th district Democratic primary election, 2024
Party	Candidate	Votes	%
Democratic	David McPherson	Unopposed	
Total votes			

Arkansas House of Representatives 7th district general election, 2024
Party	Candidate	Votes	%
Republican	Brit McKenzie (incumbent)	7,159	66.45%
Democratic	David McPherson	3,614	33.55%
Total votes		10,773	100%

=== District 8 ===
Incumbent Republican Austin McCollum has represented the 8th district since 2023. He previously represented the 95th district between 2017 and 2023.

Arkansas House of Representatives 8th district Republican primary election, 2024
Party	Candidate	Votes	%
Republican	Austin McCollum (incumbent)	Unopposed	
Total votes			

Arkansas House of Representatives 8th district general election, 2024
Party	Candidate	Votes	%
Republican	Austin McCollum (incumbent)	10,932	76.29%
Libertarian	Michael Kalagias	3,398	23.71%
Total votes		14,330	100%

=== District 9 ===
Incumbent Republican DeAnna Hodges has represented the 9th district since 2023.

Arkansas House of Representatives 9th district Republican primary election, 2024
Party	Candidate	Votes	%
Republican	DeAnna Hodges (incumbent)	Unopposed	
Total votes			

Arkansas House of Representatives 9th district Democratic primary election, 2024
Party	Candidate	Votes	%
Democratic	Diana Gonzales Worthen	Unopposed	
Total votes			

Arkansas House of Representatives 9th district general election, 2024
Party	Candidate	Votes	%
Democratic	Diana Gonzales Worthen	2,662	54.89%
Republican	DeAnna Hodges (incumbent)	2,188	45.11%
Total votes		4,850	100%

=== District 10 ===
Incumbent Republican Mindy McAlindon has represented the 10th district since 2023.

Arkansas House of Representatives 10th district Republican primary election, 2024
Party	Candidate	Votes	%
Republican	Mindy McAlindon (incumbent)	Unopposed	
Total votes			

Arkansas House of Representatives 10th district Democratic primary election, 2024
Party	Candidate	Votes	%
Democratic	Kate Schaffer	Unopposed	
Total votes			

Arkansas House of Representatives 10th district general election, 2024
Party	Candidate	Votes	%
Republican	Mindy McAlindon (incumbent)	8,587	56.2%
Democratic	Kate Schaffer	6,590	43.48%
Total votes		15,157	100%

=== District 11 ===
Incumbent Republican Rebecca Burkes has represented the 11th district since 2023.

Arkansas House of Representatives 11th district Republican primary election, 2024
Party	Candidate	Votes	%
Republican	Rebecca Burkes (incumbent)	Unopposed	
Total votes			

Arkansas House of Representatives 11th district Democratic primary election, 2024
Party	Candidate	Votes	%
Democratic	Ray Hernandez	Unopposed	
Total votes			

Arkansas House of Representatives 11th district general election, 2024
Party	Candidate	Votes	%
Republican	Rebecca Burkes (incumbent)	4,671	59.15%
Democratic	Rey Hernandez	3,226	40.85%
Total votes		7,897	100%

=== District 12 ===
Incumbent Republican Hope Hendren Duke has represented the 12th district since 2023.

Arkansas House of Representatives 12th district Republican primary election, 2024
Party	Candidate	Votes	%
Republican	Hope Hendren Duke (incumbent)	Unopposed	
Total votes			

Arkansas House of Representatives 12th district Democratic primary election, 2024
Party	Candidate	Votes	%
Democratic	David L. Barber	Unopposed	
Total votes			

Arkansas House of Representatives 12th district general election, 2024
Party	Candidate	Votes	%
Republican	Hope Hendren Duke (incumbent)	12,861	72.74%
Democratic	David L. Barber	4,819	27.26%
Total votes		17,680	100%

=== District 13 ===
Incumbent Republican Scott Richardson has represented the 13th district since 2023.

Arkansas House of Representatives 13th district Republican primary election, 2024
Party	Candidate	Votes	%
Republican	Scott Richardson (incumbent)	Unopposed	
Total votes			

Arkansas House of Representatives 13th district Democratic primary election, 2024
Party	Candidate	Votes	%
Democratic	Ashley Sheys	Unopposed	
Total votes			

Arkansas House of Representatives 13th district general election, 2024
Party	Candidate	Votes	%
Republican	Scott Richardson (incumbent)	6,170	58.41%
Democratic	Ashley Sheys	4,394	41.59%
Total votes		17,680	100%

=== District 14 ===
Incumbent Republican Grant Hodges, who has represented the 14th district since 2023, is retiring.

Arkansas House of Representatives 14th district Republican primary election, 2024
Party	Candidate	Votes	%
Republican	Nick Burkes	1,309	57.61%
Republican	Joshua Hagan	963	42.39%
Total votes		2,272	100.00%

Arkansas House of Representatives 14th district Democratic primary election, 2024
Party	Candidate	Votes	%
Democratic	Jacob Malloy	Unopposed	
Total votes			

Arkansas House of Representatives 14th district general election, 2024
Party	Candidate	Votes	%
Republican	Nick Burkes	8,823	65.22%
Democratic	Jacob Malloy	4,706	34.78%
Total votes		13,529	100%

=== District 15 ===
Incumbent Republican John P. Carr has represented the 15th district since 2023. He previously represented the 94th district between 2021 and 2023.

Arkansas House of Representatives 15th district Republican primary election, 2024
Party	Candidate	Votes	%
Republican	John P. Carr (incumbent)	Unopposed	
Total votes			

Arkansas House of Representatives 15th district Democratic primary election, 2024
Party	Candidate	Votes	%
Democratic	Stephanie Funk	436	87.03%
Democratic	Erin Lee Underhill	65	12.97%
Total votes		501	100.00%

Arkansas House of Representatives 15th district general election, 2024
Party	Candidate	Votes	%
Republican	John P. Carr (incumbent)	5,510	56.62%
Democratic	Stephanie Funk	4,221	43.38%
Total votes		9.731	100%

=== District 16 ===
Incumbent Republican Kendon Underwood has represented the 16th district since 2023. He previously represented the 90th district between 2021 and 2023.

Arkansas House of Representatives 16th district Republican primary election, 2024
Party	Candidate	Votes	%
Republican	Kendon Underwood (incumbent)	Unopposed	
Total votes			

Arkansas' 16th House District general election, 2024
Party	Candidate	Votes	%
Republican	Kendon Underwood (incumbent)	13,052	100%
Total votes		13,052	100%

=== District 17 ===
Incumbent Republican Delia Haak, who has represented the 17th district since 2023, is retiring. She previously represented the 91st district between 2021 and 2023.

Arkansas House of Representatives 17th district Republican primary election, 2024
Party	Candidate	Votes	%
Republican	Randy Torres	2,318	64.78%
Republican	Jeremey Criner	1,260	35.22%
Total votes		3,578	100.00%

Arkansas' 17th House District general election, 2024
Party	Candidate	Votes	%
Republican	Randy Torres	10,320	100%
Total votes		10,320	100%

=== District 18 ===
Incumbent Republican Robin Lundstrum has represented the 18th district since 2023. She previously represented the 87th district between 2015 and 2023.

Arkansas House of Representatives 18th district Republican primary election, 2024
Party	Candidate	Votes	%
Republican	Robin Lundstrum (incumbent)	Unopposed	
Total votes			

Arkansas House of Representatives 18th district Democratic primary election, 2024
Party	Candidate	Votes	%
Democratic	Justin Meeks	Unopposed	
Total votes			

Arkansas House of Representatives 18th district general election, 2024
Party	Candidate	Votes	%
Republican	Robin Lundstrum (incumbent)	9.332	64.42%
Democratic	Justin Meeks	5,155	35.58%
Total votes		14,487	100%

=== District 19 ===
Incumbent Republican Steve Unger has represented the 19th district since 2023.

Arkansas House of Representatives 19th district Republican primary election, 2024
Party	Candidate	Votes	%
Republican	Steve Unger (incumbent)	Unopposed	
Total votes			

Arkansas House of Representatives 19th district Democratic primary election, 2024
Party	Candidate	Votes	%
Democratic	Billy Cook	Unopposed	
Total votes			

Arkansas House of Representatives 19th district general election, 2024
Party	Candidate	Votes	%
Republican	Steve Unger (incumbent)	6,320	55.82%
Democratic	Billy Cook	5,002	44.18%
Total votes		11,322	100%

=== District 20 ===
Incumbent Democrat Denise Garner has represented the 20th district since 2023. She previously represented the 84th district between 2019 and 2023.

Arkansas House of Representatives 20th district Democratic primary election, 2024
Party	Candidate	Votes	%
Democratic	Denise Garner (incumbent)	Unopposed	
Total votes			

Arkansas' 20th House District general election, 2024
Party	Candidate	Votes	%
Democratic	Denise Garner (incumbent)	11,405	100%
Total votes		11,405	100%

=== District 21 ===
Incumbent Democrat Nicole Clowney has represented the 21st district since 2023. She previously represented the 86th district between 2019 and 2023.

Arkansas House of Representatives 21st district Democratic primary election, 2024
Party	Candidate	Votes	%
Democratic	Nicole Clowney (incumbent)	Unopposed	
Total votes			

Arkansas' 21st House District general election, 2024
Party	Candidate	Votes	%
Democratic	Nicole Clowney (incumbent)	6,898	100%
Total votes		6,898	100%

=== District 22 ===
Incumbent Democrat David Whitaker has represented the 22nd district since 2023. He previously represented the 85th district between 2013 and 2023.

Arkansas House of Representatives 22nd district Democratic primary election, 2024
Party	Candidate	Votes	%
Democratic	David Whitaker (incumbent)	Unopposed	
Total votes			

Arkansas' 22nd House District general election, 2024
Party	Candidate	Votes	%
Democratic	David Whitaker (incumbent)	8,673	100%
Total votes		8,673	100%

=== District 23 ===
Incumbent Republican Kendra Moore has represented the 23rd district since 2023.

Arkansas House of Representatives 23rd district Republican primary election, 2024
Party	Candidate	Votes	%
Republican	Kendra Moore (incumbent)	Unopposed	
Total votes			

Arkansas' 23rd House District general election, 2024
Party	Candidate	Votes	%
Republican	Kendra Moore (incumbent)	11,473	100%
Total votes		11,473	100%

=== District 24 ===
Incumbent Republican Charlene Fite, who has represented the 24th district since 2023, is retiring. She previously represented the 80th district between 2013 and 2023.

Arkansas House of Representatives 24th district Republican primary election, 2024
Party	Candidate	Votes	%
Republican	Brad Hall	2,684	69.00%
Republican	Ty Bates	1,206	31.00%
Total votes		3,890	100.00%

Arkansas House of Representatives 24th district Democratic primary election, 2024
Party	Candidate	Votes	%
Democratic	Ryan Intchauspe	Unopposed	
Total votes			

Arkansas House of Representatives 24th district general election, 2024
Party	Candidate	Votes	%
Republican	Brad Hall	10,036	82.91%
Democratic	Ryan Intchauspe	2,068	17.09%
Total votes		12,104	100%

=== District 25 ===
Incumbent Republican Chad Puryear has represented the 25th district since 2023.

Arkansas House of Representatives 25th district Republican primary election, 2024
Party	Candidate	Votes	%
Republican	Chad Puryear (incumbent)	Unopposed	
Total votes			

Arkansas House of Representatives 25th district Democratic primary election, 2024
Party	Candidate	Votes	%
Democratic	Caitlin Tannehill Oxford	Unopposed	
Total votes			

Arkansas House of Representatives 25th district general election, 2024
Party	Candidate	Votes	%
Republican	Chad Puryear (incumbent)	10,041	70.65%
Democratic	Caitlin Tannehill Oxford	4,171	29.35%
Total votes		14,212	100%

=== District 26 ===
Incumbent Republican Mark H. Berry, who has represented the 26th district since 2023, is retiring. He previously represented the 82nd district between 2021 and 2023.

Arkansas House of Representatives 26th district Republican primary election, 2024
Party	Candidate	Votes	%
Republican	James Eaton	Unopposed	
Total votes			

Arkansas' 26th House District general election, 2024
Party	Candidate	Votes	%
Republican	James Eaton	10,884	100%
Total votes		10,884	100%

=== District 27 ===
Incumbent Republican Steven Walker has represented the 27th district since 2023.

Arkansas House of Representatives 27th district Republican primary election, 2024
Party	Candidate	Votes	%
Republican	Steven Walker (incumbent)	3,042	60.43%
Republican	Timmy Reid	1,992	39.57%
Total votes		5,034	100.00%

Arkansas' 27th House District general election, 2024
Party	Candidate	Votes	%
Republican	Steven Walker (incumbent)	12,977	100%
Total votes		12,977	100%

=== District 28 ===
Incumbent Republican Bart Schulz has represented the 28th district since 2023.

Arkansas House of Representatives 28th district Republican primary election, 2024
Party	Candidate	Votes	%
Republican	Bart Schulz (incumbent)	Unopposed	
Total votes			

Arkansas' 28th House District general election, 2024
Party	Candidate	Votes	%
Republican	Bart Schulz (incumbent)	11,288	100%
Total votes		11,288	100%

=== District 29 ===
Incumbent Republican Rick McClure has represented the 29th district since 2023. He previously represented the 26th district between 2021 and 2023.

Arkansas House of Representatives 29th district Republican primary election, 2024
Party	Candidate	Votes	%
Republican	Rick McClure (incumbent)	Unopposed	
Total votes			

Arkansas' 29th House District general election, 2024
Party	Candidate	Votes	%
Republican	Rick McClure (incumbent)	9,683	100%
Total votes		9,683	100%

=== District 30 ===
Incumbent Republican Fran Cavenaugh has represented the 30th district since 2023. She previously represented the 60th district between 2017 and 2023.

Arkansas House of Representatives 30th district Republican primary election, 2024
Party	Candidate	Votes	%
Republican	Fran Cavenaugh (incumbent)	1,584	67.20%
Republican	Coty W. Powers	773	32.80%
Total votes		2,357	100.00%

Arkansas House of Representatives 30th district Democratic primary election, 2024
Party	Candidate	Votes	%
Democratic	Hamilton Holmes	Unopposed	
Total votes			

Arkansas House of Representatives 30th district general election, 2024
Party	Candidate	Votes	%
Republican	Fran Cavenaugh (incumbent)	8,923	80.61%
Democratic	Hamilton Holmes	2,147	19.39%
Total votes		11,070	100%

=== District 31 ===
Incumbent Republican Jimmy Gazaway has represented the 31st district since 2023. He previously represented the 57th district between 2017 and 2023.

Arkansas House of Representatives 31st district Republican primary election, 2024
Party	Candidate	Votes	%
Republican	Jimmy Gazaway (incumbent)	Unopposed	
Total votes			

Arkansas' 31st House District general election, 2024
Party	Candidate	Votes	%
Republican	Jimmy Gazaway (incumbent)	9,405	100%
Total votes		9,405	100%

=== District 32 ===
Incumbent Republican Jack Ladyman has represented the 32nd district since 2023. He previously represented the 59th district between 2015 and 2023.

Arkansas House of Representatives 32nd district Republican primary election, 2024
Party	Candidate	Votes	%
Republican	Jack Ladyman (incumbent)	947	54.18%
Republican	Brandt Smith	801	45.82%
Total votes		1,748	100.00%

Arkansas House of Representatives 32nd district Democratic primary election, 2024
Party	Candidate	Votes	%
Democratic	David McAvoy	Unopposed	
Total votes			

Arkansas House of Representatives 32nd district general election, 2024
Party	Candidate	Votes	%
Republican	Jack Ladyman (incumbent)	5,510	58.61%
Democratic	David McAvoy	3,585	38.13%
Libertarian	Eric McGee	306	3.25%
Total votes		9,401	100%

=== District 33 ===
Incumbent Republican Jon Milligan has represented the 33rd district since 2023. He previously represented the 53rd district between 2021 and 2023.

Arkansas House of Representatives 33rd district Republican primary election, 2024
Party	Candidate	Votes	%
Republican	Jon Milligan (incumbent)	Unopposed	
Total votes			

Arkansas' 33rd House District general election, 2024
Party	Candidate	Votes	%
Republican	Jon Milligan (incumbent)	9,814	100%
Total votes		9,814	100%

=== District 34 ===
Incumbent Republican Joey Carr has represented the 34th district since 2023.

Arkansas House of Representatives 34th district Republican primary election, 2024
Party	Candidate	Votes	%
Republican	Joey Carr (incumbent)	Unopposed	
Total votes			

Arkansas House of Representatives 34th district Democratic primary election, 2024
Party	Candidate	Votes	%
Democratic	Desmond Hammett	Unopposed	
Total votes			

Arkansas House of Representatives 34th district general election, 2024
Party	Candidate	Votes	%
Republican	Joey Carr (incumbent)	4,937	62.01%
Democratic	Desmond Hammett	2,694	37.99%
Total votes		7,091	100%

=== District 35 ===
Incumbent Democrat Milton Nicks Jr., who has represented the 35th district since 2023, is retiring. He previously represented the 50th district between 2015 and 2023.

Arkansas House of Representatives 35th district Republican primary election, 2024
Party	Candidate	Votes	%
Republican	Robert Thorne Jr.	1,247	94.11%
Republican	Gary Tobar	78	5.89%
Total votes		1,325	100.00%

Arkansas House of Representatives 35th district Democratic primary election, 2024
Party	Candidate	Votes	%
Democratic	'Jessie McGruder'	632	46.71%
Democratic	Raymond Whiteside	321	23.73%
Democratic	Demetris Johnson Jr.	208	15.37%
Democratic	Sherry Holliman	192	14.19%
Total votes		1,353	100.00%

Arkansas House of Representatives 35th district Democratic primary election runoff, 2024
Party	Candidate	Votes	%
Democratic	'Jessie McGruder'	36	60.00%
Democratic	Raymond Whiteside	24	40.00%
Total votes		60	100.00%

Arkansas House of Representatives 35th district general election, 2024
Party	Candidate	Votes	%
Democratic	Jessie McGruder	4,814	50.65%
Republican	Robert Thorne Jr.	4,691	49.35%
Total votes		9,505	100%

=== District 36 ===
Incumbent Republican Johnny Rye has represented the 36th district since 2023. He previous represented the 54th district between 2017 and 2023.

Arkansas House of Representatives 36th district Republican primary election, 2024
Party	Candidate	Votes	%
Republican	Johnny Rye (incumbent)	Unopposed	
Total votes			

Arkansas House of Representatives 36th district Democratic primary election, 2024
Party	Candidate	Votes	%
Democratic	Daniel Parker	Unopposed	
Total votes			

Arkansas House of Representatives 36th district general election, 2024
Party	Candidate	Votes	%
Republican	Johnny Rye (incumbent)	5,318	67.86%
Democratic	Daniel Parker	2,519	32.14%
Total votes		7,837	100%

=== District 37 ===
Incumbent Republican Steve Hollowell has represented the 37th district since 2023. He previous represented the 49th district between 2017 and 2023.

Arkansas House of Representatives 37th district Republican primary election, 2024
Party	Candidate	Votes	%
Republican	Steve Hollowell (incumbent)	Unopposed	
Total votes			

Arkansas House of Representatives 37th district Democratic primary election, 2024
Party	Candidate	Votes	%
Democratic	Lisa Head	Unopposed	
Total votes			

Arkansas House of Representatives 37th district general election, 2024
Party	Candidate	Votes	%
Republican	Steve Hollowell (incumbent)	7,762	72.43%
Democratic	Lisa Head	2,955	27.57%
Total votes		10,717	100%

=== District 38 ===
Incumbent Republican Dwight Tosh has represented the 38th district since 2023. He previous represented the 52nd district between 2015 and 2023.

Arkansas House of Representatives 38th district Republican primary election, 2024
Party	Candidate	Votes	%
Republican	Dwight Tosh (incumbent)	Unopposed	
Total votes			

Arkansas' 38th House District general election, 2024
Party	Candidate	Votes	%
Republican	Dwight Tosh (incumbent)	10,242	100%
Total votes		10,242	100%

=== District 39 ===
Incumbent Republican Wayne Long has represented the 39th district since 2023.

Arkansas House of Representatives 39th district Republican primary election, 2024
Party	Candidate	Votes	%
Republican	Wayne Long (incumbent)	Unopposed	
Total votes			

Arkansas' 39th House District general election, 2024
Party	Candidate	Votes	%
Republican	Wayne Long (incumbent)	8,658	100%
Total votes		8,658	100%

=== District 40 ===
Incumbent Republican Shad Pearce has represented the 40th district since 2023.

Arkansas House of Representatives 40th district Republican primary election, 2024
Party	Candidate	Votes	%
Republican	Shad Pearce (incumbent)	Unopposed	
Total votes			

Arkansas' 40th House District general election, 2024
Party	Candidate	Votes	%
Republican	Shad Pearce (incumbent)	9,920	100%
Total votes		9,920	100%

=== District 41 ===
Incumbent Republican Josh Miller, who has represented the 41st district since 2023, is retiring. He previous represented the 66th district between 2013 and 2023.

Arkansas House of Representatives 41st district Republican primary election, 2024
Party	Candidate	Votes	%
Republican	Alyssa Brown	3,952	62.67%
Republican	Jerry Holmes	2,354	37.33%
Total votes		6,306	100.00%

Arkansas House of Representatives 41st district Democratic primary election, 2024
Party	Candidate	Votes	%
Democratic	Tom Nowlin	Unopposed	
Total votes			

Arkansas House of Representatives 41st district general election, 2024
Party	Candidate	Votes	%
Republican	Alyssa Brown	12,074	79.32%
Democratic	Tom Nowlin	3,147	20.68%
Total votes		15,221	100%

=== District 42 ===
Incumbent Republican Stephen Meeks has represented the 42nd district since 2023. He previous represented the 67th district between 2011 and 2023.

Arkansas House of Representatives 42nd district Republican primary election, 2024
Party	Candidate	Votes	%
Republican	Stephen Meeks (incumbent)	Unopposed	
Total votes			

Arkansas House of Representatives 42nd district Democratic primary election, 2024
Party	Candidate	Votes	%
Democratic	Lauren Faulk	Unopposed	
Total votes			

Arkansas House of Representatives 42nd district general election, 2024
Party	Candidate	Votes	%
Republican	Stephen Meeks (incumbent)	12,238	80.05%
Democratic	Lauren Faulk	3,050	19.95%
Total votes		15,288	100%

=== District 43 ===
Incumbent Republican Rick Beck has represented the 43rd district since 2023. He previous represented the 65th district between 2015 and 2023.

Arkansas House of Representatives 43rd district Republican primary election, 2024
Party	Candidate	Votes	%
Republican	Rick Beck (incumbent)	Unopposed	
Total votes			

Arkansas' 43rd House District general election, 2024
Party	Candidate	Votes	%
Republican	Rick Beck (incumbent)	11,073	100%
Total votes		11,073	100%

=== District 44 ===
Incumbent Republican Stan Berry has represented the 44th district since 2023. He previous represented the 68th district between 2019 and 2023.

Arkansas House of Representatives 44th district Republican primary election, 2024
Party	Candidate	Votes	%
Republican	Stan Berry (incumbent)	Unopposed	
Total votes			

Arkansas' 44th House District general election, 2024
Party	Candidate	Votes	%
Republican	Stan Berry (incumbent)	11,467	100%
Total votes		11,467	100%

=== District 45 ===
Incumbent Republican Aaron Pilkington has represented the 45th district since 2023. He previous represented the 69th district between 2017 and 2023.

Arkansas House of Representatives 45th district Republican primary election, 2024
Party	Candidate	Votes	%
Republican	Aaron Pilkington (incumbent)	Unopposed	
Total votes			

Arkansas House of Representatives 45th district Democratic primary election, 2024
Party	Candidate	Votes	%
Democratic	Whitney Sheree Freeman	Unopposed	
Total votes			

Arkansas House of Representatives 45th district general election, 2024
Party	Candidate	Votes	%
Republican	Aaron Pilkington (incumbent)	8,722	76.77%
Democratic	Whitney Sheree Freeman	2,639	23.23%
Total votes		11,361	100%

=== District 46 ===
Incumbent Republican Jon S. Eubanks has represented the 46th district since 2023. He previous represented the 74th district between 2011 and 2023.

Arkansas House of Representatives 46th district Republican primary election, 2024
Party	Candidate	Votes	%
Republican	Jon S. Eubanks (incumbent)	Unopposed	
Total votes			

Arkansas' 46th House District general election, 2024
Party	Candidate	Votes	%
Republican	Jon S. Eubanks (incumbent)	10,807	100%
Total votes		10,807	100%

=== District 47 ===
Incumbent Republican Lee Johnson has represented the 47th district since 2023. He previous represented the 75th district between 2019 and 2023.

Arkansas House of Representatives 47th district Republican primary election, 2024
Party	Candidate	Votes	%
Republican	Lee Johnson (incumbent)	Unopposed	
Total votes			

Arkansas' 47th House District general election, 2024
Party	Candidate	Votes	%
Republican	Lee Johnson (incumbent)	12,761	100%
Total votes		12,761	100%

=== District 48 ===
Incumbent Republican Ryan Rose has represented the 48th district since 2023.

Arkansas House of Representatives 48th district Republican primary election, 2024
Party	Candidate	Votes	%
Republican	Ryan Rose (incumbent)	Unopposed	
Total votes			

Arkansas' 48th House District general election, 2024
Party	Candidate	Votes	%
Republican	Ryan Rose (incumbent)	7,646	100%
Total votes		7,646	100%

=== District 49 ===
Incumbent Democratic Jay Richardson has represented the 49th district since 2023. He previously represented the 78th district between 2019 and 2023.

Arkansas House of Representatives 49th district Democratic primary election, 2024
Party	Candidate	Votes	%
Democratic	Jay Richardson (incumbent)	Unopposed	
Total votes			

Arkansas' 49th House District general election, 2024
Party	Candidate	Votes	%
Democratic	Jay Richardson (incumbent)	3,847	100%
Total votes		3,847	100%

=== District 50 ===
Incumbent Republican Zachary Gramlich has represented the 50th district since 2023.

Arkansas House of Representatives 50th district Republican primary election, 2024
Party	Candidate	Votes	%
Republican	Zachary Gramlich (incumbent)	Unopposed	
Total votes			

Arkansas House of Representatives 50th district Democratic primary election, 2024
Party	Candidate	Votes	%
Democratic	Robin W. McCray	Unopposed	
Total votes			

Arkansas House of Representatives 50th district general election, 2024
Party	Candidate	Votes	%
Republican	Zachary Gramlich (incumbent)	6,329	63.96%
Democratic	Robin W. McCray	3,567	36.04%
Total votes		9,896	100%

=== District 51 ===
Incumbent Republican Cindy Crawford has represented the 51st district since 2023. She previously represented the 76th district between 2019 and 2023.

Arkansas House of Representatives 51st district Republican primary election, 2024
Party	Candidate	Votes	%
Republican	Cindy Crawford (incumbent)	2,742	77.20%
Republican	Jeff Burks	810	22.80%
Total votes		3,552	100.00%

Arkansas House of Representatives 51st district Democratic primary election, 2024
Party	Candidate	Votes	%
Democratic	Jane-Ellen Udouj-Kutchka	Unopposed	
Total votes			

Arkansas House of Representatives 51st district general election, 2024
Party	Candidate	Votes	%
Republican	Cindy Crawford (incumbent)	9,032	68.23%
Democratic	Jane-Ellen Udouj-Kutchka	4,206	31.77%
Total votes		13,238	100%

=== District 52 ===
Incumbent Republican Marcus Richmond has represented the 52nd district since 2023. He previously represented the 21st district between 2015 and 2023.

Arkansas House of Representatives 52nd district Republican primary election, 2024
Party	Candidate	Votes	%
Republican	Marcus Richmond (incumbent)	Unopposed	
Total votes			

Arkansas' 52nd House District general election, 2024
Party	Candidate	Votes	%
Republican	Marcus Richmond (incumbent)	9,109	100%
Total votes		9.109	100%

=== District 53 ===
Incumbent Republican Matt Duffield has represented the 53rd district since 2023.

Arkansas House of Representatives 53rd district Republican primary election, 2024
Party	Candidate	Votes	%
Republican	Matt Duffield (incumbent)	Unopposed	
Total votes			

Arkansas House of Representatives 53rd district Democratic primary election, 2024
Party	Candidate	Votes	%
Democratic	Amie Gates	Unopposed	
Total votes			

Arkansas House of Representatives 53rd district general election, 2024
Party	Candidate	Votes	%
Republican	Matt Duffield (incumbent)	6,763	73.39%
Democratic	Amie Gates	2,452	26.61%
Total votes		9,215	100%

=== District 54 ===
Incumbent Republican Mary Bentley has represented the 54th district since 2023. She previously represented the 73rd district between 2015 and 2023.

Arkansas House of Representatives 54th district Republican primary election, 2024
Party	Candidate	Votes	%
Republican	Mary Bentley (incumbent)	Unopposed	
Total votes			

Arkansas House of Representatives 54th district Democratic primary election, 2024
Party	Candidate	Votes	%
Democratic	Doug Corbitt	Unopposed	
Total votes			

Arkansas House of Representatives 54th district general election, 2024
Party	Candidate	Votes	%
Republican	Mary Bentley (incumbent)	9,453	69.65%
Democratic	Doug Corbitt	4,120	30.35%
Total votes		13,573	100%

=== District 55 ===
Incumbent Republican Matthew Brown has represented the 55th district since 2023.

Arkansas House of Representatives 55th district Republican primary election, 2024
Party	Candidate	Votes	%
Republican	Matthew Brown (incumbent)	Unopposed	
Total votes			

Arkansas House of Representatives 55th district Democratic primary election, 2024
Party	Candidate	Votes	%
Democratic	Cynthia Nations	Unopposed	
Total votes			

Arkansas House of Representatives 55th district general election, 2024
Party	Candidate	Votes	%
Republican	Matthew Brown (incumbent)	7,063	58.5%
Democratic	Cynthia Nations	5,011	41.5%
Total votes		12,074	100%

=== District 56 ===
Incumbent Democrat Steve Magie has represented the 56th district since 2023. He previously represented the 72nd district between 2013 and 2023.

Arkansas House of Representatives 56th district Republican primary election, 2024
Party	Candidate	Votes	%
Republican	Kim Slaughter	Unopposed	
Total votes			

Arkansas House of Representatives 56th district Democratic primary election, 2024
Party	Candidate	Votes	%
Democratic	Steve Magie (incumbent)	813	71.88%
Democratic	Queen Lakeslia Mosley	318	28.12%
Total votes		1,131	100.00%

Arkansas House of Representatives 56th district general election, 2024
Party	Candidate	Votes	%
Democratic	Steve Magie (incumbent)	5,959	53.82%
Republican	Kim Slaughter	5,113	46.18%
Total votes		11,072	100%

=== District 57 ===
Incumbent Republican Cameron Cooper has represented the 57th district since 2023. He previously represented the 44th district between 2019 and 2023.

Arkansas House of Representatives 57th district Republican primary election, 2024
Party	Candidate	Votes	%
Republican	Cameron Cooper (incumbent)	Unopposed	
Total votes			

Arkansas House of Representatives 57th district Democratic primary election, 2024
Party	Candidate	Votes	%
Democratic	Ciara' Bolte	Unopposed	
Total votes			

Arkansas House of Representatives 57th district general election, 2024
Party	Candidate	Votes	%
Republican	Cameron Cooper (incumbent)	11,987	84.74%
Democratic	Ciara' Bolte	2,159	15.26%
Total votes		14,146	100%

=== District 58 ===
Incumbent Republican Les Eaves has represented the 58th district since 2023. He previously represented the 46th district between 2015 and 2023.

Arkansas House of Representatives 58th district Republican primary election, 2024
Party	Candidate	Votes	%
Republican	Les Eaves (incumbent)	Unopposed	
Total votes			

Arkansas House of Representatives 58th district Democratic primary election, 2024
Party	Candidate	Votes	%
Democratic	Trevor McGarrah	Unopposed	
Total votes			

Arkansas House of Representatives 58th district general election, 2024
Party	Candidate	Votes	%
Republican	Les Eaves (incumbent)	8,773	75.55%
Democratic	Trevor McGarrah	2,839	24.45%
Total votes		11,612	100%

=== District 59 ===
Incumbent Republican Jim Wooten has represented the 59th district since 2023. He previously represented the 45th district between 2019 and 2023.

Arkansas House of Representatives 59th district Republican primary election, 2024
Party	Candidate	Votes	%
Republican	Jim Wooten (incumbent)	Unopposed	
Total votes			

Arkansas' 59th House District general election, 2024
Party	Candidate	Votes	%
Republican	Jim Wooten (incumbent)	10,570	100%
Total votes		10,570	100%

=== District 60 ===
Incumbent Republican Roger Lynch has represented the 60th district since 2023. He previously represented the 14th district between 2017 and 2023.

Arkansas House of Representatives 60th district Republican primary election, 2024
Party	Candidate	Votes	%
Republican	Roger Lynch (incumbent)	Unopposed	
Total votes			

Arkansas' 60th House District general election, 2024
Party	Candidate	Votes	%
Republican	Roger Lynch (incumbent)	10,944	100%
Total votes		10,944	100%

=== District 61 ===
Incumbent Republican Jeremiah Moore has represented the 61st district since 2023.

Arkansas House of Representatives 61st district Republican primary election, 2024
Party	Candidate	Votes	%
Republican	Jeremiah Moore (incumbent)	Unopposed	
Total votes			

Arkansas House of Representatives 61st district general election, 2024
Party	Candidate	Votes	%
Republican	Jeremiah Moore	7,698	77.79%
Libertarian	Garrett Sheeks	2,198	22.21%
Total votes		9,896	100%

=== District 62 ===
Incumbent Republican Mark D. McElroy has represented the 62nd district since 2023. He previously represented the 11th district between 2021 and 2023.

Arkansas House of Representatives 62nd district Republican primary election, 2024
Party	Candidate	Votes	%
Republican	Mark D. McElroy (incumbent)	Unopposed	
Total votes			

Arkansas House of Representatives 62nd district Democratic primary election, 2024
Party	Candidate	Votes	%
Democratic	Dexter R. Miller	1,557	56.78%
Democratic	Kellee Mitchell Farris	1,185	43.22%
Total votes		2,742	100.00%

Arkansas House of Representatives 62nd district general election, 2024
Party	Candidate	Votes	%
Republican	Mark D. McElroy (incumbent)	4,845	53.65%
Democratic	Dexter R. Miller	4,185	46.35%
Total votes		9,030	100%

=== District 63 ===
Incumbent Democrat Deborah Ferguson, who has represented the 63rd district since 2023, is retiring. She previously represented the 51st district between 2013 and 2023.

Arkansas House of Representatives 63rd district Republican primary election, 2024
Party	Candidate	Votes	%
Republican	Tammi Northcutt Bell	Unopposed	
Total votes			

Arkansas House of Representatives 63rd district Democratic primary election, 2024
Party	Candidate	Votes	%
Democratic	Lincoln Barnett	837	48.49%
Democratic	Fred Leonard	729	42.24%
Democratic	Billy Thomen	160	9.27%
Total votes		1,726	100.00%

Arkansas House of Representatives 63rd district Democratic primary runoff, 2024
Party	Candidate	Votes	%
Democratic	Lincoln Barnett	774	65.48%
Democratic	Fred Leonard	408	34.52%
Total votes		1,182	100.00%

Arkansas House of Representatives 63rd district general election, 2024
Party	Candidate	Votes	%
Democratic	Lincoln Barnett	4,218	54.83%
Republican	Tammi Northcutt Bell	3,475	45.17%
Total votes		7,693	100%

=== District 64 ===
Incumbent Democrat Ken Ferguson has represented the 64th district since 2023. He previously represented the 16th district between 2015 and 2023.

Arkansas House of Representatives 64th district Democratic primary election, 2024
Party	Candidate	Votes	%
Democratic	Ken Ferguson (incumbent)	Unopposed	
Total votes			

Arkansas' 64th House District general election, 2024
Party	Candidate	Votes	%
Democratic	Ken Ferguson (incumbent)	7,429	100%
Total votes		7,429	100%

=== District 65 ===
Incumbent Democrat Vivian Flowers, who has represented the 65th district since 2023, is retiring to run for Mayor of Pine Bluff. She previously represented the 17th district between 2015 and 2023.

Arkansas House of Representatives 65th district Democratic primary election, 2024
Party	Candidate	Votes	%
Democratic	'Glenn Barnes'	1,807	65.02%
Democratic	Kanisher Wooten Caldwell	972	34.98%
Total votes		2,779	100.00%

Arkansas' 65th House District general election, 2024
Party	Candidate	Votes	%
Democratic	Glenn Barnes	6,183	100%
Total votes		6,183	100%

=== District 66 ===
Incumbent Democrat Mark Perry has represented the 66th district since 2023. He previously served in the House of Representatives between 2009 and 2013.

Arkansas House of Representatives 66th district Republican primary election, 2024
Party	Candidate	Votes	%
Republican	Nick Priest	Unopposed	
Total votes			

Arkansas House of Representatives 66th district Democratic primary election, 2024
Party	Candidate	Votes	%
Democratic	Mark Perry (incumbent)	Unopposed	
Total votes			

Arkansas House of Representatives 66th district general election, 2024
Party	Candidate	Votes	%
Republican	Wayne M. Ball	2,537	29.76%
Democratic	Mark Perry (incumbent)	5,987	70.24%
Total votes		8,524	100%

=== District 67 ===
Incumbent Republican Karilyn Brown has represented the 67th district since 2023. She previously represented the 41st district between 2015 and 2013.

Arkansas House of Representatives 67th district Republican primary election, 2024
Party	Candidate	Votes	%
Republican	Karilyn Brown (incumbent)	Unopposed	
Total votes			

Arkansas House of Representatives 67th district Democratic primary election, 2024
Party	Candidate	Votes	%
Democratic	Andrew Cade Eberly	Unopposed	
Total votes			

Arkansas House of Representatives 67th district general election, 2024
Party	Candidate	Votes	%
Republican	Karilyn Brown (incumbent)	6,550	52.23%
Democratic	Andrew Cade Eberly	5,991	47.77%
Total votes		12,541	100%

=== District 68 ===
Incumbent Republican Brian S. Evans has represented the 68th district since 2023. He previously represented the 43rd district between 2019 and 2013.

Arkansas House of Representatives 68th district Republican primary election, 2024
Party	Candidate	Votes	%
Republican	Brian S. Evans (incumbent)	Unopposed	
Total votes			

Arkansas House of Representatives 68th district Democratic primary election, 2024
Party	Candidate	Votes	%
Democratic	Tom Bartole		
Total votes			

Arkansas House of Representatives 68th district general election, 2024
Party	Candidate	Votes	%
Republican	Brian S. Evans (incumbent)	10,002	78.2%
Democratic	Tom Bartole	2,789	21.8%
Total votes		12,541	100%

=== District 69 ===
Incumbent Republican David Ray has represented the 69th district since 2023. He previously represented the 40th district between 2021 and 2013.

Arkansas House of Representatives 69th district Republican primary election, 2024
Party	Candidate	Votes	%
Republican	David Ray (incumbent)	Unopposed	
Total votes			

Arkansas House of Representatives 69th district Democratic primary election, 2024
Party	Candidate	Votes	%
Democratic	Kwami Abdul-Bey		
Total votes			

Arkansas House of Representatives 69th district general election, 2024
Party	Candidate	Votes	%
Republican	David Ray (incumbent)	8,254	71.25%
Democratic	Kwami Abdul-Bey	3,330	28.75%
Total votes		12,791	100%

=== District 70 ===
Incumbent Republican Carlton Wing has represented the 70th district since 2023. He previously represented the 38th district between 2017 and 2013.

Arkansas House of Representatives 70th district Republican primary election, 2024
Party	Candidate	Votes	%
Republican	Carlton Wing (incumbent)		
Total votes			

Arkansas House of Representatives 70th district Democratic primary election, 2024
Party	Candidate	Votes	%
Democratic	Alex Holladay		
Total votes			

Arkansas House of Representatives 70th district general election, 2024
Party	Candidate	Votes	%
Republican	Carlton Wing (incumbent)	7,541	50.97%
Democratic	Alex Holladay	7,255	49.03%
Total votes		14,796	100%

=== District 71 ===
Incumbent Republican Brandon Achor has represented the 71st district since 2023.

Arkansas House of Representatives 71st district Republican primary election, 2024
Party	Candidate	Votes	%
Republican	Brandon Achor (incumbent)		
Total votes			

Arkansas House of Representatives 71st district Democratic primary election, 2024
Party	Candidate	Votes	%
Democratic	Cassandra D. Green		
Total votes			

Arkansas House of Representatives 71st district general election, 2024
Party	Candidate	Votes	%
Republican	Brandon Achor (incumbent)	7,226	55.68%
Democratic	Cassandra D. Green	5,752	44.32%
Total votes		12,978	100%

=== District 72 ===
Incumbent Democrat Jamie Aleshia Scott, who has represented the 72nd district since 2023, is retiring to run for State Senate. She previously represented the 37th district between 2019 and 2023.

Arkansas House of Representatives 72nd district Democratic primary election, 2024
Party	Candidate	Votes	%
Democratic	Tracy Steele		
Total votes			

Arkansas' 72nd House District general election, 2024
Party	Candidate	Votes	%
Democratic	Tracy Steele	6,294	100%
Total votes		6,294	100%

=== District 73 ===
Incumbent Democrat Andrew Collins has represented the 73rd district since 2023. He previously represented the 35th district between 2019 and 2023.

Arkansas House of Representatives 73rd district Democratic primary election, 2024
Party	Candidate	Votes	%
Democratic	Andrew Collins (incumbent)		
Total votes			

Arkansas' 73rd House District general election, 2024
Party	Candidate	Votes	%
Democratic	Andrew Collins (incumbent)	11,278	100%
Total votes		11,278	100%

=== District 74 ===
Incumbent Democrat Tippi McCullough has represented the 74th district since 2023. She previously represented the 33rd district between 2019 and 2023.

Arkansas House of Representatives 74th district Democratic primary election, 2024
Party	Candidate	Votes	%
Democratic	Tippi McCullough (incumbent)		
Total votes			

Arkansas' 74th House District general election, 2024
Party	Candidate	Votes	%
Democratic	Tippi McCullough (incumbent)	10,938	100%
Total votes		10,938	100%

=== District 75 ===
Incumbent Democrat Ashley Hudson has represented the 75th district since 2023. She previously represented the 32nd district between 2021 and 2023.

Arkansas House of Representatives 75th district Democratic primary election, 2024
Party	Candidate	Votes	%
Democratic	Ashley Hudson (incumbent)		
Total votes			

Arkansas House of Representatives 75th district general election, 2024
Party	Candidate	Votes	%
Democratic	Ashley Hudson	8,537	64.9%
Libertarian	Michael White	4,618	35.1%
Total votes		13,155	100%

=== District 76 ===
Incumbent Democrat Joy C. Springer has represented the 76th district since 2023. She previously represented the 34th district between 2020 and 2023.

Arkansas House of Representatives 76th district Democratic primary election, 2024
Party	Candidate	Votes	%
Democratic	Joy C. Springer (incumbent)	992	50.98
Democratic	Ryan Davis	825	42.39
Democratic	Kia Sprinkle Wilson	129	6.63
Majority		167	8.58
Total votes		1,946	

Arkansas' 76th House District general election, 2024
Party	Candidate	Votes	%
Democratic	Joy C. Springer (incumbent)	6,600	100%
Total votes		6,600	100%

=== District 77 ===
Incumbent Democrat Fred Allen has represented the 77th district since 2023. He previously represented the 33rd district between 2017 and 2023 and between 2007 and 2013.

Arkansas House of Representatives 77th district Democratic primary election, 2024
Party	Candidate	Votes	%
Democratic	Fred Allen (incumbent)	1,883	86.42
Democratic	Grant Smith	296	13.58
Majority		1,587	72.83
Total votes			2,179

Arkansas' 77th House District general election, 2024
Party	Candidate	Votes	%
Democratic	Fred Allen (incumbent)	8,117	100%
Total votes		8,117	100%

=== District 78 ===
Incumbent Republican Keith Brooks has represented the 78th district since 2023. He previously represented the 31st district between 2021 and 2023.

Arkansas House of Representatives 78th district Republican primary election, 2024
Party	Candidate	Votes	%
Republican	Keith Brooks (incumbent)		
Total votes			

Arkansas House of Representatives 78th district Democratic primary election, 2024
Party	Candidate	Votes	%
Democratic	James Henry Bartolomei		
Total votes			

Arkansas House of Representatives 78th district general election, 2024
Party	Candidate	Votes	%
Republican	Keith Brooks (incumbent)	11,078	67.25%
Democratic	James Henry Bartolomei	5,395	32.75%
Total votes		16,473	100%

=== District 79 ===
Incumbent Democrat Tara Shephard has represented the 79th district since 2023.

Arkansas House of Representatives 79th district Democratic primary election, 2024
Party	Candidate	Votes	%
Democratic	Tara Shephard (incumbent)		
Total votes			

Arkansas' 79th House District general election, 2024
Party	Candidate	Votes	%
Democratic	Tara Shephard (incumbent)	5,987	100%
Total votes		5,987	100%

=== District 80 ===
Incumbent Democrat Denise Ennett has represented the 80th district since 2023. She previously represented the 36th district between 2019 and 2023.

Arkansas House of Representatives 80th district Democratic primary election, 2024
Party	Candidate	Votes	%
Democratic	Denise Ennett (incumbent)	1,401	64.41
Democratic	R. Roosevelte Williams III	774	35.59
Majority		627	28.83
Total votes		2,175	

Arkansas' 80th House District general election, 2024
Party	Candidate	Votes	%
Democratic	Denise Ennett (incumbent)	6,925	100%
Total votes		6,925	100%

=== District 81 ===
Incumbent Republican R. J. Hawk has represented the 81st district since 2023.

Arkansas House of Representatives 81st district Republican primary election, 2024
Party	Candidate	Votes	%
Republican	R. J. Hawk (incumbent)		
Total votes			

Arkansas House of Representatives 81st district Democratic primary election, 2024
Party	Candidate	Votes	%
Democratic	Gina Thomas-Littlejohn		
Total votes			

Arkansas House of Representatives 81st district general election, 2024
Party	Candidate	Votes	%
Republican	R. J. Hawk (incumbent)	6,973	60.2%
Democratic	Gina Thomas-Littlejohn	4,610	39.8
Total votes		11,583	100%

=== District 82 ===
Incumbent Republican Tony Furman has represented the 82nd district since 2023. He previously represented the 28th district between 2021 and 2023.

Arkansas House of Representatives 82nd district Republican primary election, 2024
Party	Candidate	Votes	%
Republican	Tony Furman (incumbent)		
Total votes			

Arkansas House of Representatives 82nd district Democratic primary election, 2024
Party	Candidate	Votes	%
Democratic	Samuel Brazell Jr.		
Total votes			

Arkansas House of Representatives 82nd district general election, 2024
Party	Candidate	Votes	%
Republican	Tony Furman (incumbent)	7,431	67.5%
Democratic	Samuel Brazell Jr.	3,578	32.5%
Total votes		11,009	100%

=== District 83 ===
Incumbent Republican Lanny Fite, who has represented the 83rd district since 2023, is retiring. He previously represented the 23rd district between 2015 and 2023.

Arkansas House of Representatives 83rd district Republican primary election, 2024
Party	Candidate	Votes	%
Republican	Paul Childress	3,648	71.29
Republican	Ken Yang	1,469	28.71
Majority		2,179	42.58
Total votes		5,117	

Arkansas House of Representatives 83rd district Democratic primary election, 2024
Party	Candidate	Votes	%
Democratic	Teresa Dannaway		
Total votes			

Arkansas House of Representatives 83rd district general election, 2024
Party	Candidate	Votes	%
Republican	Paul Childress	13,545	75.1%
Democratic	Teresa Dannaway	4,491	24.9%
Total votes		18.036	100%

=== District 84 ===
Incumbent Republican Les Warren has represented the 84th district since 2023. He previously represented the 25th district between 2017 and 2023.

Arkansas House of Representatives 84th district Republican primary election, 2024
Party	Candidate	Votes	%
Republican	Les Warren (incumbent)		
Total votes			

Arkansas House of Representatives 84th district Democratic primary election, 2024
Party	Candidate	Votes	%
Democratic	Jill Summerford		
Total votes			

Arkansas House of Representatives 84th district general election, 2024
Party	Candidate	Votes	%
Republican	Les Warren (incumbent)	7,354	67.79%
Democratic	Jill Summerford	3,494	32.21%
Total votes		10,848	100%

=== District 85 ===
Incumbent Republican Richard McGrew has represented the 85th district since 2023. He previously represented the 22nd district between 2020 and 2023.

Arkansas House of Representatives 85th district Republican primary election, 2024
Party	Candidate	Votes	%
Republican	Richard McGrew (incumbent)		
Total votes			

Arkansas House of Representatives 85th district Democratic primary election, 2024
Party	Candidate	Votes	%
Democratic	Cortney Warwick McKee		
Total votes			

Arkansas House of Representatives 85th district general election, 2024
Party	Candidate	Votes	%
Republican	Richard McGrew (incumbent)	10,153	75.61%
Democratic	Cortney Warwick McKee	3,275	24.39%
Total votes		13,428	199%

=== District 86 ===
Incumbent Republican John Maddox has represented the 86th district since 2023. He previously represented the 20th district between 2017 and 2023.

Arkansas House of Representatives 86th district Republican primary election, 2024
Party	Candidate	Votes	%
Republican	John Maddox (incumbent)		
Total votes			

Arkansas House of Representatives 86th district Democratic primary election, 2024
Party	Candidate	Votes	%
Democratic	Bill Bradshaw		
Total votes			

Arkansas House of Representatives 86th district general election, 2024
Party	Candidate	Votes	%
Republican	John Maddox (incumbent)	11,181	87.82%
Democratic	Bill Bradshaw	1,550	12.18%
Total votes		12,731	100%

=== District 87 ===
Incumbent Republican DeAnn Vaught has represented the 87th district since 2023. She previously represented the 4th district between 2015 and 2023.

Arkansas House of Representatives 87th district Republican primary election, 2024
Party	Candidate	Votes	%
Republican	DeAnn Vaught (incumbent)		
Total votes			

Arkansas House of Representatives 87th district general election, 2024
Party	Candidate	Votes	%
Republican	DeAnn Vaught	8,212	84.05%
Libertarian	Marc Rossen	1,558	15.95%
Total votes		9,770	100%

=== District 88 ===
Incumbent Republican Danny Watson, who has represented the 88th district since 2023, is retiring. He previously represented the 3rd district between 2017 and 2023.

Arkansas House of Representatives 88th district Republican primary election, 2024
Party	Candidate	Votes	%
Republican	Annetta Bradford	1,437	47.24
Republican	Dolly Henley	1,374	45.17
Republican	Robert Leslie Bradford	231	7.59
Total votes		3,042	100.00

Arkansas House of Representatives 88th district runoff Republican primary election, 2024
Party	Candidate	Votes	%
Republican	Dolly Henley	1,329	56.39
Republican	Arnetta Bradford	1,028	43.61
Total votes		2,357	100.00

Arkansas House of Representatives 88th district general election, 2024
Party	Candidate	Votes	%
Republican	Dolly Henley	6,246	71.49%
Libertarian	Tammy Goodwin	2,491	28.51%
Total votes		8,737	100%

=== District 89 ===
Incumbent Republican Justin Gonzales has represented the 89th district since 2023. He previously represented the 19th district between 2015 and 2023.

Arkansas House of Representatives 89th district Republican primary election, 2024
Party	Candidate	Votes	%
Republican	Justin Gonzales (incumbent)		
Total votes			

Arkansas' 89th House District general election, 2024
Party	Candidate	Votes	%
Republican	Justin Gonzales (incumbent)	10,173	100%
Total votes		10,173	100%

=== District 90 ===
Incumbent Republican Richard Womack has represented the 90th district since 2023. He previously represented the 18th district between 2013 and 2023.

Arkansas House of Representatives 90th district Republican primary election, 2024
Party	Candidate	Votes	%
Republican	Richard Womack (incumbent)		
Total votes			

Arkansas' 90th House District general election, 2024
Party	Candidate	Votes	%
Republican	Richard Womack (incumbent)	9,958	100%
Total votes		9.958	100%

=== District 91 ===
Incumbent Republican Bruce Cozart has represented the 24th district since 2023. He previously represented the 18th district between 2011 and 2023.

Arkansas House of Representatives 91st district Republican primary election, 2024
Party	Candidate	Votes	%
Republican	Bruce Cozart (incumbent)		
Total votes			

Arkansas' 91st House District general election, 2024
Party	Candidate	Votes	%
Republican	Bruce Cozart (incumbent)	8,860	100%
Total votes		8,860	100%

=== District 92 ===
Incumbent Republican Julie Mayberry has represented the 92nd district since 2023. He previously represented the 27th district between 2015 and 2023.

Arkansas House of Representatives 92nd district Republican primary election, 2024
Party	Candidate	Votes	%
Republican	Julie Mayberry (incumbent)		
Total votes			

Arkansas House of Representatives 92nd district Democratic primary election, 2024
Party	Candidate	Votes	%
Democratic	David Murray		
Total votes			

Arkansas House of Representatives 92nd district general election, 2024
Party	Candidate	Votes	%
Republican	Julie Mayberry (incumbent)	11,425	84.79%
Democratic	David Murray	2,049	15.21%
Total votes		13,474	100%

=== District 93 ===
Incumbent Republican Mike Holcomb has represented the 93rd district since 2023. He previously represented the 10th district between 2013 and 2023.

Arkansas House of Representatives 93rd district Republican primary election, 2024
Party	Candidate	Votes	%
Republican	Mike Holcomb (incumbent)		
Total votes			

Arkansas' 93rd House District general election, 2024
Party	Candidate	Votes	%
Republican	Mike Holcomb (incumbent)	10,851	100%
Total votes		10,851	100%

=== District 94 ===
Incumbent Republican Jeff Wardlaw has represented the 94th district since 2023. He previously represented the 8th district between 2011 and 2023.

Arkansas House of Representatives 94th district Republican primary election, 2024
Party	Candidate	Votes	%
Republican	Jeff Wardlaw (incumbent)		
Total votes			

Arkansas House of Representatives 94th district Democratic primary election, 2024
Party	Candidate	Votes	%
Democratic	Annette Taylor		
Total votes			

Arkansas House of Representatives 94th district general election, 2024
Party	Candidate	Votes	%
Republican	Jeff Wardlaw (incumbent)	6,385	65.55%
Democratic	Annette Taylor	3,356	34.45%
Total votes		9,741	100%

=== District 95 ===
Incumbent Republican Howard Beaty Jr. has represented the 95th district since 2023. He previously represented the 9th district between 2021 and 2023.

Arkansas House of Representatives 95th district Republican primary election, 2024
Party	Candidate	Votes	%
Republican	Howard Beaty Jr. (incumbent)		
Total votes			

Arkansas' 95th House District general election, 2024
Party	Candidate	Votes	%
Republican	Howard Beaty Jr. (incumbent)	8,849	100%
Total votes		8,849	100%

=== District 96 ===
Incumbent Republican Sonia Eubanks Barker has represented the 96th district since 2023. He previously represented the 7th district between 2017 and 2023.

Arkansas House of Representatives 96th district Republican primary election, 2024
Party	Candidate	Votes	%
Republican	Sonia Eubanks Barker (incumbent)		
Total votes			

Arkansas House of Representatives 96th district Democratic primary election, 2024
Party	Candidate	Votes	%
Democratic	Robin G. Roark	375	52.74
Democratic	Horace Ray Charles	336	47.26
Majority		39	5.49
Total votes		711	

Arkansas House of Representatives 96th district general election, 2024
Party	Candidate	Votes	%
Republican	Sonia Eubanks Barker (incumbent)	8,990	72.81%
Democratic	Robin G. Roark	3,358	27.19%
Total votes		12,348	100%

=== District 97 ===
Incumbent Republican Matthew Shepherd has represented the 97th district since 2023. He previously represented the 6th district between 2011 and 2023.

Arkansas House of Representatives 97th district Republican primary election, 2024
Party	Candidate	Votes	%
Republican	Matthew Shepherd (incumbent)		
Total votes			

Arkansas House of Representatives 97th district Democratic primary election, 2024
Party	Candidate	Votes	%
Democratic	O'Dell Carr		
Total votes			

Arkansas House of Representatives 97th district general election, 2024
Party	Candidate	Votes	%
Republican	Matthew Shepherd (incumbent)	7,881	69.5%
Democratic	O'Dell Carr	3,459	30.5%
Total votes		11,340	100%

=== District 98 ===
Incumbent Republican Wade Andrews has represented the 98th district since 2023. He previously represented the 6th district between 2011 and 2023.

Arkansas House of Representatives 98th district Republican primary election, 2024
Party	Candidate	Votes	%
Republican	Wade Andrews (incumbent)		
Total votes			

Arkansas House of Representatives 98th district Democratic primary election, 2024
Party	Candidate	Votes	%
Democratic	Tyler L. Linton		
Total votes			

Arkansas House of Representatives 98th district general election, 2024
Party	Candidate	Votes	%
Republican	Wade Andrews (incumbent)	8,609	100%
Total votes		8,609	100%

=== District 99 ===
Incumbent Republican Lane Jean has represented the 99th district since 2023. He previously represented the 2nd district between 2013 and 2023.

Arkansas House of Representatives 99th district Republican primary election, 2024
Party	Candidate	Votes	%
Republican	Lane Jean (incumbent)		
Total votes			

Arkansas' 99th House District general election, 2024
Party	Candidate	Votes	%
Republican	Lane Jean (incumbent)	10,630	100%
Total votes		10,630	100%

=== District 100 ===
Incumbent Republican Carol Dalby has represented the 100th district since 2023. She previously represented the 1st district between 2017 and 2023.

Arkansas House of Representatives 100th district Republican primary election, 2024
Party	Candidate	Votes	%
Republican	Carol Dalby (incumbent)		
Total votes			

Arkansas' 100th House District general election, 2024
Party	Candidate	Votes	%
Republican	Carol Dalby (incumbent)	8,761	100%
Total votes		8,761	100%

== See also ==
- List of Arkansas General Assemblies
