= Mark H. Berry =

American politician

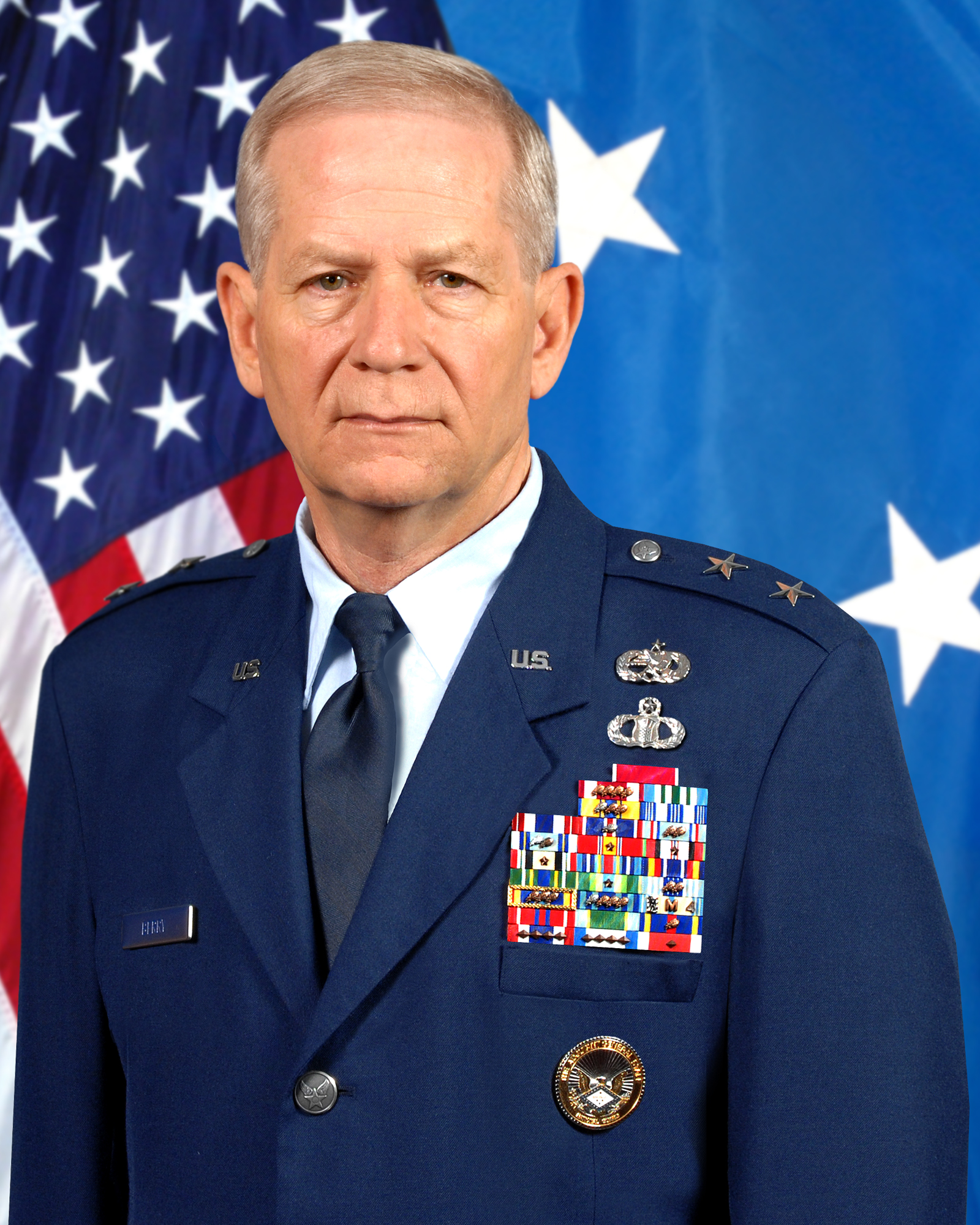

Member of the Arkansas House of Representatives from the 26th district
- In office January 9, 2023 – January 12, 2025
- Preceded by: Rick McClure
- Succeeded by: James Eaton

Member of the Arkansas House of Representatives from the 82nd district
- In office January 2021 – January 9, 2023
- Preceded by: Sarah Capp
- Succeeded by: Tony Furman

Personal details
- Party: Republican
- Spouse: Theresa
- Education: Master's degree
- Alma mater: Golden Gate University, Embry-Riddle Aeronautical University

Military service
- Years of service: 1974-2019
- Country of Allegiance: United States

Mark H. Berry is an American politician who has served as a member of the Arkansas House of Representatives from January 2021 through January 2025

== Military service ==
Berry enlisted in the Air Force in August 1974 and completed training at Lackland Air Force Base. He joined the Arkansas Air National Guard in September 1992. He was assigned to the 188th Fighter Wing.

== Electoral history ==
He was first elected in the 2020 Arkansas House of Representatives election to the 82nd district. He was elected to the 26th district in the 2022 Arkansas House of Representatives election due to redistricting.

== Biography ==
Berry graduated from Embry–Riddle Aeronautical University and earned his master's degree from Golden Gate University. He resides in Ozark, Arkansas. He is a Baptist.
