= Rey Hernandez =

American politician

Member-elect of the Arkansas House of Representatives from the 11th district
- Assuming office January 2027
- Succeeding: Rebecca Burkes

Personal details
- Party: Democratic
- Website: hernandezforarkansas.com

Rey Hernandez is an American politician. A member of the Democratic Party, he is the member-elect for the 11th district of the Arkansas House of Representatives. He unseated incumbent Republican Rebecca Burkes. He is a veteran of the United States Marine Corps. Hernandez is Hispanic.
