= Vivian Flowers =

American politician

Mayor of Pine Bluff
- Incumbent
- Assumed office January 1, 2025
- Preceded by: Shirley Washington

Member of the Arkansas House of Representatives from the 65th district
- In office January, 2014 – January 13, 2025
- Preceded by: Delia Haak
- Succeeded by: Glenn Barnes

Personal details
- Party: Democratic
- Education: University of Arkansas at Little Rock (BA), Clinton School of Public Service (MPS)

Vivian Flowers is an American politician who is the mayor of Pine Bluff, Arkansas. She served in the Arkansas House of Representatives and is a Democrat. She is a graduate of the University of Arkansas at Little Rock. She lives in Pine Bluff, Arkansas.

She made a statement for the 50th anniversary of the Arkansas ACLU applauding its work and noting "Our rights are under attack."

She and another politician who is African American were involved in an incident where police were called and a complaint filed in 2020. She has called for various police reforms after the incident. She has represented Districts 17 and 65 in the Arkansas House since 2015.

Flowers did not run for re-election to the Arkansas House of Representatives in 2024, opting instead to run for mayor of Pine Bluff, Arkansas. Flowers defeated incumbent mayor Shirley Washington in the Democratic primary runoff in April 2024, and defeated Libertarian John Fenley in the general election on November 5, 2024. Washington was the first African American woman to serve as mayor of Pine Bluff.
