= Randy Torres (politician) =

American politician

Member of the Arkansas House of Representatives from the 17th district
- Incumbent
- Assumed office January 13, 2025
- Succeeded by: Delia Haak

Personal details
- Party: Republican

Randy Torres is an American politician who was elected member of the Arkansas House of Representatives for the 17th district in 2024.

He is of Latino descent
