= DeAnna Hodges =

American politician in Arkansas

Member of the Arkansas House of Representatives from the 9th district
- Incumbent
- Assumed office January 9, 2023
- Preceded by: Howard Beaty

Personal details
- Born: Nashville, Arkansas, U.S.
- Party: Republican
- Education: High School
- Alma mater: Ouachita Baptist University
- Profession: Realtor

DeAnna Hodges is an American politician serving the 9th district, which includes a portion of Washington County in the Arkansas House of Representatives. She was elected to the seat in the 2022 election against Democratic opponent Diana Gonzales Worthen, and Libertarian opponent Steven Stilling. In the Arkansas 94th Legislative Assembly, she serves on two committees. The House Public Transportation Committee, and the House City, County and Local Affairs Committee.

She ran for reelection in the November 2024 General Election, but lost in a rematch with her 2022 opponent.

== Electoral history ==
Year	Office	District	Democratic		Republican	
2024	Arkansas House of Representatives	House District 9	Diana Gonzalez Worthen	54.9%	DeAnna Hodges	45.1%

Year	Office	District	Republican		Democratic		Libertarian	
2022	Arkansas House of Representatives	House District 9	DeAnna Hodges	50.00%	Diana Gonzalez Worthen	46.19.0%	Steven Stilling	3.81%
