= 2026 Arkansas county judge elections =

United States local elections

- November 3, 2026

75 elected county executives
Party	Republican	Democratic	Independent
Current seats	66	9	2
- Status of the incumbents: Republican incumbent Republican incumbent retiring or lost renomination Democratic incumbent Democratic incumbent retiring or lost renomination Independent incumbent Independent incumbent retiring

Elections for county judges will be held in the U.S. State of Arkansas in each of its 75 counties. County judges are the equivalent to county executives.

These elections will take place alongside races for U.S. Senate, U.S. House, governor, state senate, state house, and numerous other state and local offices.

== Retirements ==
=== Republican ===
- Benton County: Barry Moehring is retiring.
- Bradley County: Klay McKinney is retiring.

=== Democratic ===
- Ouachita County: Robert McAdoo is retiring.
- Phillips County: Clark Hall did not file to run for re-election.

== Incumbents defeated ==
=== Republican ===
- Drew County: Jessie L. Griffin lost renomination to Michael L. Owens.
- Poinsett County: J. C. Carter lost renomination to Randy Mills.
- Prairie County: Lawrence Holloway lost renomination to Johnny Reidhar.
- Washington County: Patrick Deakins lost renomination to Tim Shepard.

=== Democratic ===
- Pulaski County: Barry Hyde lost renomination to Wendell Griffen.

== Pulaski County ==
Three-term Democratic incumbent judge Barry Hyde ran for re-election but lost renomination in the primary to pastor Wendell Griffen.

=== Democratic primary ===
==== Nominee ====
- Wendell Griffen, pastor and former circuit judge

==== Eliminated in primary ====
- Barry Hyde, incumbent Judge

==== Results ====
2026 Pulaski County Judge election, Democratic primary Unofficial results
Party	Candidate	Votes	%
Democratic	Wendell Griffen	25,638	62.70%
Democratic	Barry Hyde (incumbent)	15,251	37.30%
Total votes		40,889	100.00%

=== Republican primary ===
Only one candidate filed, so the Republican primary was canceled.

==== Nominee ====
- Michael Rushin

=== General election ===
==== Results ====
2026 Pulaski County Judge election
Party	Candidate	Votes	%
Democratic	Wendell Griffen		
Republican	Michael Rushin		

== Benton County ==
Three-term Republican incumbent Judge Barry Moehring declined to run for re-election. State representative Austin McCollum won the Republican primary and is running unopposed in the general election.

=== Republican primary ===
==== Nominee ====
- Austin McCollum, member of the Arkansas House of Representatives and former majority leader (2021–2023) from the 8th (2023–present) and 95th district (2017–2023)

==== Eliminated in primary ====
- Carrie Perrien Smith

==== Declined ====
- Barry Moehring, incumbent Judge

==== Results ====
2026 Benton County Judge election, Republican primary Unofficial results
Party	Candidate	Votes	%
Republican	Austin McCollum (incumbent)	12,266	64.06%
Republican	Carrie Perrien Smith	6,882	35.94%
Total votes		19,148	100.00%

=== General election ===
==== Results ====
2026 Benton County Judge election
Party	Candidate	Votes	%
Republican	Austin McCollum (incumbent)		

== Washington County ==
One-term incumbent Republican judge Patrick Deakins is running for re-election. He advanced to the Republican runoff election, but trailed by seventeen percentage points to political newcomer Tim Shepard in the first round.

=== Republican primary ===
==== Advanced to runoff ====
- Patrick Deakins, incumbent Judge
- Tim Shepard, police administrator

==== Eliminated in primary ====
- Mark Scalise, attorney and businessman

==== Results ====
===== First round =====
2026 Washington County Judge election, Republican primary
Party	Candidate	Votes	%
Republican	Tim Shepard	8,022	48.48%
Republican	Patrick Deakins (incumbent)	5,200	31.43%
Republican	Mark Scalise	3,324	20.09%
Total votes		16,546	100.00%

===== Runoff =====
2026 Washington County Judge election, Republican runoff
Party	Candidate	Votes	%
Republican	Tim Shepard	5,472	77.08%
Republican	Patrick Deakins (incumbent)	1,627	22.92%
Total votes		7,099	100%

=== Democratic primary ===
Only one candidate filed, so the Democratic primary was canceled.

==== Nominee ====
- Dana Deree

=== General election ===
==== Results ====
2026 Washington County Judge election
Party	Candidate	Votes	%
Republican	Tim Shepard		
Democratic	Dana Deree		

== Faulkner County ==
Three-term incumbent Republican judge Allen Dodson is running for re-election unopposed.

=== General election ===
==== Results ====
2026 Faulkner County Judge election
Party	Candidate	Votes	%
Republican	Allen Dodson (incumbent)		

== Saline County ==
One-term incumbent Republican judge Matt Brumley is running for re-election unopposed.

=== General election ===
==== Results ====
2026 Saline County Judge election
Party	Candidate	Votes	%
Republican	Matt Brumley (incumbent)		

== Sebastian County ==
One-term incumbent Republican judge Steve Hotz is running for re-election.

=== Republican primary ===
==== Nominee ====
- Steve Hotz, incumbent Judge

==== Eliminated in primary ====
- Ken Blevins

==== Results ====
2026 Sebastian County Judge election, Republican primary Unofficial results
Party	Candidate	Votes	%
Republican	Steve Hotz (incumbent)	8,166	79.72%
Republican	Ken Blevins	2,077	20.28%
Total votes		10,243	100.00%

=== General election ===
==== Results ====
2026 Sebastian County Judge election
Party	Candidate	Votes	%
Republican	Steve Hotz (incumbent)		

== Other counties (A–W) ==
Every county in Arkansas will hold a county judge election in November 2026.

County	Incumbent			Candidates
County	Judge	Party	Status	Candidates
Arkansas	Thomas Eddie Best	Republican	Incumbent retired.	▌Eddie Roberson (Republican); ▌Michael Blasengame (Independent)
Ashley	Jim Hudson	Republican	Incumbent running for re-election.	▌Jim Hudson (Republican); ▌Jim Wells (Independent)
Drew	Jessie L. Griffin	Republican	Incumbent lost renomination.	▌Michael L. Owens (Republican): Republican primary: ▌ ✓ Michael L. Owens: 844 votes, 53.69%; ▌Jessie L. Griffin: 728 votes, 46.31%
Baxter	Kevin Litty	Republican	Incumbent running for re-election.	▌ Kevin Litty (Republican); Republican primary: ▌ ✓ Kevin Litty (Republican) 4,467 votes, 62.05%; ▌Eric Payne (Republican) 2,732 votes, 37.95%
Clay	Mike Patterson	Republican	Incumbent running for re-election.	Republican runoff: ▌Mike Patterson; ▌Todd Watson; Republican primary: ▌ Mike Patterson: 1,191 votes, 44.79%; ▌ Todd Watson: 782 votes, 29.41%; ▌Rob Chandler: 686 votes, 25.80%
Greene	Rusty McMillon	Republican	Incumbent running for re-election.	▌Jerry Shipman (Democrat): ▌Rusty McMillon (Republican); Republican primary: ▌ ✓ Rusty McMillon: 3,556 votes, 60.81%; ▌Kim Reeves: 2,291 votes, 39.19%
Lincoln	Buddy Earnest	Republican	Incumbent running for re-election.	▌Randy Morgan (Independent); ▌J.T. Smith (Independent); Republican runoff: ▌Buddy Earnest; ▌John Powell; Republican primary: ▌ Buddy Earnest: 559 votes, 44.65%; ▌ John Powell: 430 votes, 34.35%; ▌Don Woodard: 263 votes, 21.01%
Madison	Larry D. Garrett	Republican	Incumbent running for re-election.	Republican runoff: ▌Larry D. Garrett; ▌Ted Walker; Republican primary: ▌ Larry D. Garrett: 1,648 votes, 45.50%; ▌ Ted Walker: 1,188 votes, 32.80%; ▌JR Scott: 786 votes, 21.70%
Poinsett	J. C. Carter	Republican	Incumbent lost renomination.	▌Kevin W. Caldwell (Independent); ▌John K. Hutchison (Independent); ▌Randy Mill (Republican); Republican primary: ▌ ✓ Randy Mills: 1,016 votes, 58.19%; ▌J. C. Carter: 730 votes, 41.81%
Prairie	Lawrence Holloway	Republican	Incumbent lost renomination.	▌Johnny Reidhar (Republican); Republican primary: ▌ ✓ Johnny Reidhar: 1,211 votes, 74.52%; ▌Lawrence Holloway: 414 votes, 25.48%
Woodruff	Michael John Gray	Independent	Incumbent running for re-election.	▌Michael John Gray (Independent)

== See also ==
- Government of Arkansas
- 2026 United States local elections
- 2026 Arkansas elections
