= Zachary Gramlich =

American politician

Member of the Arkansas House of Representatives from the 50th district
- Incumbent
- Assumed office January 9, 2023
- Preceded by: Milton Nicks Jr.

Personal details
- Born: 1993 or 1994 (age 32–33)
- Party: Republican
- Children: 1
- Education: Degree in Biology, master's degree in educational leadership
- Alma mater: Arkansas State University, University of Arkansas at Fort Smith

Zachary Gramlich is an American politician who has served as a member of the Arkansas House of Representatives since January 9, 2023. He represents Arkansas's 50th House district.

== Electoral history ==
He was first elected on November 8, 2022, in the 2022 Arkansas House of Representatives election against Democratic opponent Diane Osborne and Libertarian opponent Stephen Edwards. He assumed office on January 9, 2023.

== Biography ==
Gramlich earned a Degree in Biology from the University of Arkansas at Fort Smith and a master's degree in educational leadership from Arkansas State University. He is a Catholic. He is a Teacher for Fort Smith School District outside of politics.

Arkansas House of Representatives
Preceded by Milton Nicks Jr.	Member of the Arkansas House of Representatives; 2023–present	Succeeded by incumbent
