= Glenn Barnes =

American politician

Member of the Arkansas House of Representatives from the 65th district
- Incumbent
- Assumed office January 13, 2025
- Succeeded by: Vivian Flowers

Personal details
- Party: Democratic

Glenn Barnes is an American politician who was elected member of the Arkansas House of Representatives for the 65th district in 2024.
