= Cody Rogers (Arkansas politician) =

American politician

Member-elect of the Arkansas House of Representatives from the 6th district
- Assuming office January 2027
- Succeeding: Harlan Breaux

Personal details
- Party: Republican

Cody Rogers is an American politician. A member of the Republican Party, he is the member-elect for the 6th district of the Arkansas House of Representatives.
