= Ozarka College =

Community college in Arkansas, U.S.

Coordinates: 36.05489°N 91.89528°W

- Former names: Ozarka Vocational-Technical School; Ozarka Technical College
- Motto: Providing life-changing experiences through education.
- Type: Public community college
- Established: 1975
- President: Dr. Josh Wilson
- Students: 1,325
- Location: Melbourne, Arkansas, United States
- Colors: Crimson, White, and Black
- Website: www.ozarka.edu/

Ozarka College (OC) is a public community college with its main campus in Melbourne, Arkansas and satellite campuses in Mountain View, Ash Flat, and Mammoth Spring. The college serves the populations of Izard, Stone, Fulton, and Sharp counties.

== History ==
The school opened in 1975 as Ozarka Vocational-Technical School and was renamed to Ozarka Technical College by the Arkansas legislature in 1991. In 1999, it dropped the word Technical from its name to emphasize its wider range of programs. Currently the college enrolls approximately 1,500 students per semester.

In 1996, Ozarka College was accredited by The Higher Learning Commission of the North Central Association of Colleges and Schools.

In 2002, the college received a 30-acre (120,000 m^{2}) donation to serve as the site of a distance learning center in Ash Flat, Arkansas. The donation came from First National Bank of Sharp County and Bob Watson of Brooksville, Florida. It had an assessed value of 105,000 dollars. In 2008 a new 9,200-square-foot (850 m^{2}) structure designed by Rico Harris of Harris Architecture in Hot Springs, Arkansas was completed to accompany the existing 18,000-square-foot (1,700 m^{2}) building.

In 2004, the library was renamed to Paul Weaver Library to honor the senator Paul Weaver due to his contribution to Ozarka College and its community.

2015 marked Ozarka College's 40th anniversary as well as the 10th anniversary of permanent campuses in Ash Flat and Mountain View and the 5th anniversary of the Mammoth Spring campus.

Student Services Center

On January 29, 2015, Ozarka College held a ribbon cutting ceremony for the new Student Services Center on the main campus in Melbourne. The Student Services Center is the first two-story building in the history of Ozarka College and houses all of Ozarka's Student Services departments including: Admissions, Financial Aid, Career Pathways, TRiO Student Support Services and others. The new Ozarka College Cafe is also located on the ground floor of the building and is open to the public.

== Notable alumni ==
- Gerald Clarke, artist and educator
- Steven Walker, American politician
