= Arkansas House of Representatives 1st district =

American legislative district

Arkansas's 1st House of Representatives district is one of 100 Arkansas House of Representatives districts. It is currently represented by Jeremy Woolridge.

== List of representatives ==
Leg.	Representative	Term start	Term end	Electoral history	Counties represented
83rd	Kim D. Hendren	January 2001	January 2003	Later served in the Senate (2003-2013)	
84th	David Morris Haak	January 2003	January 10, 2005	Previously served in District 21 (2001-2003)	
85th	Steve Harrelson	January 10, 2005	January 2007	Later served in the Senate (2011-2013)	
86th	Steve Harrelson	January 2007	January 2009	Later served in the Senate (2011-2013)	
87th	Steve Harrelson	January 2009	January 2011	Later served in the Senate (2011-2013)	
88th	Mary Prissy Hickerson	January 2011	January 2013	[data missing]	Miller (part)
89th	Mary Prissy Hickerson	January 2013	January 2015	[data missing]	Miller (part)
90th	Mary Prissy Hickerson	January 2015	January 9, 2017	[data missing]	Miller (part)
91st	Carol Dalby	January 2017	January 2019	[data missing]	Texarkana; Miller (part)
92nd	Carol Dalby	January 2019	January 2021	[data missing]	Texarkana; Miller (part)
93rd	Carol Dalby	January 2021	January 2023	[data missing]	Texarkana; Miller (part)
94th	Jeremy Woolridge	January 2023	January 2025	[data missing]	Clay, and parts of Greene, and Randolph
95th	Jeremy Woolridge	January 2025	January 2027	[data missing]	Clay, and parts of Greene, and Randolph

== Election results ==
Year	Opponent	Party	Percent	Candidate	Party	Percent
2012 (Note: Incumbent ran unopposed)	Mary P. Hickerson	Republican	100%			
2014 (Note: Incumbent ran unopposed)	Mary P. Hickerson	Republican	100%			
2016 (Note: Incumbent ran unopposed)	Carol Dalby	Republican	100%			
2018	Carol Dalby	Republican	Cancelled			
2020 (Note: Incumbent ran unopposed)	Carol Dalby	Republican	100%			
2022	Jeremy Woolridge	Republican	81.4%	Teresa Roofe	Democratic	18.6%
2024	Jeremy Woolridge	Republican	Cancelled			
2026	Mark Nichols	Republican	TBD			
