= James Eaton (politician) =

American politician

Member of the Arkansas House of Representatives from the 26th district
- Incumbent
- Assumed office January 13, 2025
- Succeeded by: Mark H. Berry

Personal details
- Party: Republican
- Website: https://eatonforarkansas.com/

James Eaton is an American politician who was elected member of the Arkansas House of Representatives for the 26th district in 2024.

Eaton holds a bachelor's degree from Arkansas Tech University and a master's degree from the University of Central Arkansas.
