= Joey L. Carr =

American politician

Member of the Arkansas House of Representatives from the 34th district
- Incumbent
- Assumed office January 9, 2023
- Preceded by: Joy C. Springer

Personal details
- Party: Republican
- Spouse: DeAnna
- Children: 4
- Education: Bachelor of Science in education, Master of Science in education
- Alma mater: Arkansas State University, University of Central Arkansas
- Profession: Principal of an Elementary School

Joey L. Carr is an American politician who has served as a member of the Arkansas House of Representatives since January 9, 2023. He represents Arkansas' 34th House district.

== Electoral history ==
He was elected on November 8, 2022, in the 2022 Arkansas House of Representatives election against Democratic opponent Ollie Collins. He assumed office on January 9, 2023.

== Biography ==
Carr earned a Bachelor of Science in education from the University of Central Arkansas and a Master of Science in education from Arkansas State University. Outside of politics, he works as an elementary school principal with the Armorel School District. He is a Baptist.

Arkansas House of Representatives
Preceded by Joy C. Springer	Member of the Arkansas House of Representatives; 2023–present	Succeeded by incumbent
