= Dexter Miller =

American politician

Member-elect of the Arkansas House of Representatives from the 62nd district
- Assuming office January 2027
- Succeeding: Mark McElroy

Personal details
- Born: Lakeview, Arkansas
- Party: Democratic
- Website: dexterforarkansas.com

Dexter R. Miller is an American politician. A member of the Democratic Party, he is the member-elect for the 62nd district of the Arkansas House of Representatives. He unseated incumbent Republican Mark McElroy in the 2026 election. He was previously a candidate for the same district in 2022 and 2024. He works for the Department of Elementary and Secondary Education.

== Elections ==
Dexter R. Miller won the 2022 General Democratic primary for Arkansas House of Representatives against Kellee Mitchell Farris. He lost the General election against Republican Mark McElroy, 48.7 to 51.3, with a total vote count of 7740.

2022 General Democratic primary District 62
Party	Candidate	Votes	%	±%
Democratic	Dexter Miller	1,786	54.3	
Democratic	Kellee Mitchell Farris	1,505	45.7	

2022 Arkansas House of Representatives District 62 general election
Party	Candidate	Votes	%	±%
Democratic	Dexter Miller	3,772	48.7	
Republican	Mark McElroy	3,968	51.3	

Dexter R. Miller lost the 2024 General election for Arkansas House of Representatives against the republican Mark McElroy. There were 9,030 total votes.

2024 Arkansas House of Representatives District 62 general election
Party	Candidate	Votes	%	±%
Democratic	Dexter Miller	4,185	46.3	
Republican	Mark McElroy	4,845	53.7	

Dexter R. Miller won the 2026 primary automatically because no other democrat tried to run. He won the 2026 General election for Arkansas House of Representatives against the republican Mark McElroy. There was a total vote count of 7456.

2026 Arkansas House of Representatives District 62 general election
Party	Candidate	Votes	%	±%
Democratic	Dexter Miller	4,031	54.1	
Republican	Mark McElroy	3,425	45.9	

== Background ==
Dexter R. Miller grew up and was born in Lakeview, Arkansas. He currently lives in Helena, Arkansas.

He attended C.V. White High School and Phillips Community College. He graduated with a bachelor's degree in business administration from Ashford College.

Miller's first job after graduating was an operator at Cedar Chemical Corporation in Helena. He was later promoted to supervisor.
