= Mary Broadaway =

American politician

Member of the Arkansas House of Representatives from the 57th district
- In office 2013–2017
- Preceded by: Jerry Brown
- Succeeded by: Jimmy Gazaway

Personal details
- Party: Democratic
- Spouse: Brad
- Education: Trinity University; University of Arkansas
- Occupation: Attorney

Mary Broadaway is an American politician who served as a member of the Arkansas House of Representatives for the 57th district from 2013 to 2017. Broadaway is also an attorney in private practice.
