= Brian Armas =

American politician

Member-elect of the Arkansas House of Representatives from the 8th district
- Assuming office January 2027
- Succeeding: Austin McCollum

Personal details
- Party: Republican

Brian Armas is an American politician. A member of the Republican Party, he is the member-elect for the 8th district of the Arkansas House of Representatives.
