= Jessie McGruder =

American politician

Member of the Arkansas House of Representatives from the 35th district
- Incumbent
- Assumed office January 13, 2025
- Succeeded by: Milton Nicks Jr.

Personal details
- Party: Democratic

Jessie McGruder is an American politician who was elected member of the Arkansas House of Representatives for the 35th district in 2024.

McGruder is a public schoolteacher and football coach and former police officer.
