= Fred Smith (Arkansas politician) =

American politician

Fredrick Smith

Member of the Arkansas House of Representatives from the 50th district
- In office January 14, 2013 – January 2015
- Preceded by: Mark Biviano (redistricted)
- Succeeded by: Milton Nicks Jr.

Member of the Arkansas House of Representatives from the 54th district
- In office January 10, 2011 – September 12, 2011
- Preceded by: Otis L. Davis
- Succeeded by: Hudson Hallum

Personal details
- Party: Democratic (2010–2011, 2014–present); Green (2012–2014)
- Education: Oral Roberts University

Fredrick Smith is an American politician and a former professional basketball player. A Democrat for most of his life, Smith was briefly the highest ranking elected officeholder of the Green Party.

== Early life and education ==
Smith attended Crawfordsville High School in Crawfordsville in Crittenden County in eastern Arkansas. He subsequently attended Oral Roberts University in Tulsa, Oklahoma.

== Career ==
After college, he was recruited by the Harlem Globetrotters in New York City. In 1997, he set the world record for a vertical slam dunk at 11 feet 11 inches (3.63 m). Smith was eventually selected for the Harlem Globetrotters all-time roster. Retiring from sports, Smith returned to Arkansas in 2004 and founded the non-profit organization Save Our Kids.

=== Arkansas House of Representatives ===
==== Elections ====
===== 2010 =====
State Representative Otis Davis decided to retire in 2010. Smith decided to run in the open Arkansas House District 54. In the four-candidate primary, Smith ranked first with 40 percent of the vote. James Pulliaum ranked second with 26 percent. In the run-off, Smith defeated Pulliaum 53-47 percent, a difference of 127 votes. Smith won the general election with 81% of the vote.

Smith was under indictment for felony theft at the time, stemming from an incident in which he erroneously received a double payment to his Save Our Kids non-profit organization, cashed both checks and deposited one, for nearly $30,000, into a personal account. Smith served for only 19 days in the Arkansas House before resigning in January 2011 after a Chicot County, Arkansas judge found him guilty of theft. The conviction was expunged in 2012, making Smith eligible to seek public office once again.

===== 2012 =====
After having his conviction expunged, Smith announced his decision to run once more for Arkansas House of Representatives. The Democratic Party of Arkansas filed a lawsuit against Smith in order to keep him off the ballot. This led Smith to register with the Green Party of Arkansas. Smith ran against Democratic incumbent Hudson Hallum in the general election for District 50, largely the former District 54, redrawn in 2011 to reflect 2010 census figures.

Ironically, in September 2012, Hallum resigned after pleading guilty to charges of conspiracy to commit voter fraud. On Election Day, just hours before the polls closed, Judge Mary McGowan granted Smith's request that none of the votes for Hallum be counted, leading to Smith receiving 100% of the vote on election day. Although none of the votes cast for Hallum, which had he won would have created a vacancy and necessitated a special election, out of more than 20,000 votes cast county-wide, only 2,200 voted in favor of Smith over the potential for a special election.

Smith is the second former Green Party member elected to the Arkansas State Legislature, following Richard Carroll, who was elected in 2008 from District 39 on the Green Party ticket but switched to the Democratic Party afterward, only to be defeated in the 2010 Democratic primary.

===== 2014 =====
During his tenure, Smith voted with the Democrats most of the time. He ran unsuccessfully in the Democratic primary for the nomination to his House seat. He was unseated in the primary by Milton Nicks Jr., who received 1,045 votes (66%) to Smith's 530 (34%).
