= Bart Schulz =

American politician

Member of the Arkansas House of Representatives from the 28th district
- Incumbent
- Assumed office January 9, 2023
- Preceded by: Tony Furman

Personal details
- Party: Republican
- Spouse: Brandi
- Children: 4

Bart Schulz is an American politician who has served as a member of the Arkansas House of Representatives since January 9, 2023. He represents Arkansas' 28th House district.

== Electoral history ==
He was elected on November 8, 2022, in the 2022 Arkansas House of Representatives election unopposed. He assumed office on January 9, 2023.

== Political Positions ==
Schulz is anti-abortion.

== Biography ==
Schulz graduated from Evening Shade High School. He has been a volunteer firefighter since 1987. He is a Christian.

Arkansas House of Representatives
Preceded by Tony Furman	Member of the Arkansas House of Representatives; 2023–present	Succeeded by incumbent
