= Jason Nazarenko =

American politician

Member of the Arkansas House of Representatives from the 4th district
- Incumbent
- Assumed office January 13, 2025
- Preceded by: Jack Fortner

Personal details
- Party: Republican
- Spouse: Kammi Statler
- Occupation: Pilot
- Website: jasonnazarenko.com

Jason Nazarenko is an American politician from Arkansas. In 2024, he was elected to represent the 4th district in the Arkansas House of Representatives, which contains Marion County and parts of Baxter County. A Republican, he is retired from the military. He is a Baptist. He lives in Cotter, Arkansas. He and his wife have two adult children.

He began his military career as a cook, became a pilot, and then a Blackhawk helicopter pilot with the Army's elite 160th Special Operations Aviation Regiment also known as "The Night Stalkers". He holds a bachelors, two masters and is working to finish his PhD in Leadership and Organizational Change. He graduated from Embry Riddle Aeronautical University and Columbia Southern University. He retired from the military in 2019. He worked as an ambulance helicopter pilot and volunteers as the President for the Cotter Area Chamber of Commerce. He started and is the CEO for multiple small businesses after retiring. He and his wife renovated an old home and he was involved in building restorations in Cotter.
