= Brit McKenzie =

American politician

Member of the Arkansas House of Representatives from the 7th district
- Incumbent
- Assumed office January 9, 2023
- Preceded by: Sonia Eubanks Barker

Personal details
- Born: Fayetteville, Arkansas
- Party: Republican
- Education: Bachelor's degree in Government
- Alma mater: Hampden–Sydney College

Brit McKenzie is an American politician who has served as a member of the Arkansas House of Representatives since January 9, 2023. He represents Arkansas' 7th House district. He has worked as a Congressional staffer.

== Electoral history ==
He was elected unopposed on November 8, 2022, in the 2022 Arkansas House of Representatives election. He assumed office on January 9, 2023.

== Biography ==
McKenzie is a Roman Catholic. He earned a Bachelor's degree in Government from Hampden–Sydney College in 2013.

Alabama House of Representatives
Preceded by Sonia Eubanks Barker	Member of the Arkansas House of Representatives; 2023–present	Succeeded by incumbent
