= Julie Mayberry =

American politician

Member of the Arkansas House of Representatives from the 27th district
- In office January 2014 – January 9, 2023
- Succeeded by: Steven Walker

Member of the Arkansas House of Representatives from the 92nd district
- Incumbent
- Assumed office January 9, 2023
- Preceded by: Gayla McKenzie

Personal details
- Party: Republican
- Spouse: Andy Mayberry
- Children: 4
- Education: Bachelor of Science in mass communications and broadcast journalism
- Alma mater: Emerson College

Julie Mayberry is an American politician who has served as a member of the Arkansas House of Representatives since January 2019. She currently represents Arkansas' 92nd House district.

== Biography ==
Mayberry earned a Bachelor of Science in mass communications and broadcast journalism from Emerson College. She contracted COVID-19 in 2021. She is a Missionary Baptist.

== Electoral history ==
She was first elected to the house in the 2014 Arkansas House of Representatives election to the 27th district unopposed. She did not seek re-election in 2016. She was then reelected unopposed in the 2018 Arkansas House of Representatives election. She was reelected unopposed in the 2020 Arkansas House of Representatives election. Due to redistricting, she ran for the 92nd district against Libertarian opponent Chris Hayes.
