= Wade Andrews =

American politician

Member of the Arkansas House of Representatives from the 98 district
- Incumbent
- Assumed office January 9, 2023
- Preceded by: David Fielding

Personal details
- Party: Republican
- Education: Bachelor of Science, Agriculture Business
- Alma mater: Southern Arkansas University
- Profession: First Responder, Farmer, Realtor, Auctioneer

Wade Andrews is a Republican member of the Arkansas House of Representatives for District 98, which includes portions of Ouachita, Columbia, Nevada, and Lafayette counties. He has held this seat since January 9, 2023, after being elected in the 2022 Arkansas House of Representatives election. He resides in Camden.

== Biography ==
Outside of politics, Andrews works as firefighter, realtor, and an Auctioneer. He is a Christian. He is a graduate of Camden Fairview High School and Southern Arkansas University.
