= Jack Fortner =

American politician

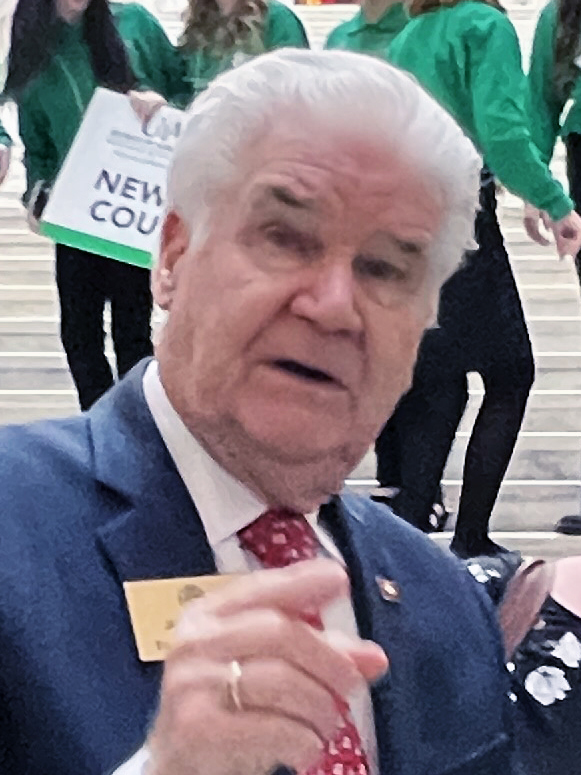
- Fortner in 2023

Member of the Arkansas House of Representatives from the 4th district
- In office January 9, 2023 – January 13, 2025
- Preceded by: (redistricting)
- Succeeded by: Jason Nazarenko

Member of the Arkansas House of Representatives from the 99th district
- In office November 8, 2016 – January 9, 2023
- Preceded by: Kelley Linck
- Succeeded by: (redistricting)

Personal details
- Party: Republican
- Education: University of Nevada

Jack Fortner is an American politician who served as a member of the Arkansas House of Representatives from 2017 to 2025.

== Electoral history ==
Fortner was first elected to the house in 2016 to the 99th district. He was reelected in 2018 and 2020. He was elected on November 8, 2022, in the 2022 Arkansas House of Representatives election to the 4th district. He assumed office on January 9, 2023. He announced he would not seek a fifth term in July 2023.

Fortner introduced H.B. 1547 extending the requirements to vehicles 45 yrs and older rather than 25 yrs in the Arkansas state legislature in 2017, even as other states were lowering their respective requirements. In his testimony to the Arkansas legislature, he stated, "I don’t think anything good happened in the auto field after '72." He withdrew it three days later, citing opposition from Arkansas car collectors. "Regardless of my personal feelings, I must go with the will of the people," he said at the time.

Not to be deterred Fortner introduced H.B. 1496, a bill with only minor revisions from H.B. 1547.a mere 2 yrs later in 2019. The new bill still pushed back the antique car registration cutoff to 45 years. While H.B. 1496 initially failed in the state senate the chamber later expunged that vote and passed the bill, paving the way for it to be signed into law—as Act 368.

In August 2025 Fortner was appointed to the Arkansas State Library Board by Governor Sarah Huckabee Sanders.

== Biography ==
Fortner served in the U.S. Navy during the Vietnam War. He is a Baptist. He attended the University of Nevada.
