= Austin McCollum =

American politician

Majority Leader of the Arkansas House of Representatives
- In office January 11, 2021 – January 9, 2023
- Preceded by: Marcus Richmond
- Succeeded by: Marcus Richmond

Member of the Arkansas House of Representatives
- In office January 9, 2017 – August 5, 2026
- Succeeded by: Brian Armas (elect)
- Constituency: District 8 (2023–2026); District 95 (2017–2023)

Personal details
- Born: 1990 or 1991 (age 35–36)
- Party: Republican
- Education: University of Tulsa (BS)

Austin McCollum (born 1990/1991) is a former state legislator in Arkansas first elected to the Arkansas House of Representatives in 2016 and served as Majority Leader. He lives in Bentonville, Arkansas where he represented the 8th District.

He declined to seek another term in the state house in 2026, instead choosing to run for Benton County Judge, the county's top executive position. He won the Republican nomination on March 3, 2026, and is currently running in the general election unopposed.

He graduated from the University of Tulsa.

== Resignation and Arrest ==
On August 1, 2026, McCollum was arrested and booked into the Benton County Jail on charges of first-degree false imprisonment, aggravated assault on a family or household member, and third-degree domestic battery. He resigned from the Arkansas House on August 5.

Arkansas House of Representatives
Preceded by Marcus Richmond	Majority Leader of the Arkansas House of Representatives; 2021–2023	Succeeded by Marcus Richmond
