= Jimmy Gazaway =

American politician

Member of the Arkansas House of Representatives from the 57th district
- Incumbent
- Assumed office January 2017
- Preceded by: Mary Broadaway

Personal details
- Party: Republican
- Education: Arkansas State University (BA); University of Arkansas (JD)

Jimmy Gazaway is an American attorney and politician serving as a member of the Arkansas House of Representatives from the 57th district. Elected in November 2016, he assumed office in January 2017.

== Education ==
Gazaway earned a Bachelor of Arts degree in political science from Arkansas State University in 2003 and a Juris Doctor from the University of Arkansas School of Law in 2006.

== Career ==
Gazaway worked as an attorney at the Benson Law Firm from 2006 to 2008 before co-founding an independent law practice. Since 2008, he has also served as a prosecutor for the state and various local governments. He was elected to the Arkansas House of Representatives in November 2016 and assumed office in January 2017. In March 2017, Gazaway sponsored a bill that would prohibit the release of video or audio that depicts the death of a police officer in the line of duty. Since 2019, Gazaway has also served as chair of the House Joint Performance Review Committee.
