= Chad Puryear =

American politician

Member of the Arkansas House of Representatives from the 25th district
- Incumbent
- Assumed office January 9, 2023
- Preceded by: Les Warren

Personal details
- Party: Republican
- Education: Bachelor of Science in Agriculture, Master of Science in Education
- Alma mater: Arkansas State University; University of Arkansas
- Profession: Farmer, Special Education public teacher

Chad Puryear is an American politician who has served as a member of the Arkansas House of Representatives since January 9, 2023. He represents Arkansas' 25th House district.

== Electoral history ==
Puryear won the Republican nomination after a surviving a recount, having led the primary by just 6 votes. He was elected on November 8, 2022, in the 2022 Arkansas House of Representatives election against Democratic opponent Caitlin Oxford. He assumed office on January 9, 2023.

== Biography ==
Puryear earned a Bachelor of Science in Agriculture from the University of Arkansas and my Master of Science in Education from Arkansas State University Puryear is a member of the National Rifle Association of America. His family are 6th generation farmers in Arkansas.

Arkansas House of Representatives
Preceded by Les Warren	Member of the Arkansas House of Representatives; 2023–present	Succeeded by incumbent
