= Jeremy Wooldridge =

American politician

Member of the Arkansas House of Representatives from the 1st district
- Incumbent
- Assumed office January 9, 2023
- Preceded by: Carol Dalby
- Succeeded by: Mark Nichols (elect)

Personal details
- Party: Republican
- Spouse: Stephanie
- Children: 2
- Education: bachelor's degree in business administration, master's degree in social work
- Alma mater: Crowley's Ridge Academy, Arkansas State University

Jeremy Wooldridge is an American politician serving as a member of the Arkansas House of Representatives from the 1st district. He assumed office on January 9, 2023, after winning the seat in the 2022 election. On March 3, 2026, Wooldridge would successfully manage to defeat Arkansas Senate Majority leader Blake Johnson in the Republican primary.

== Biography ==
Wooldridge is CEO of Crowley's Ridge Development Council.
