= Wayne Long (Arkansas politician) =

American politician

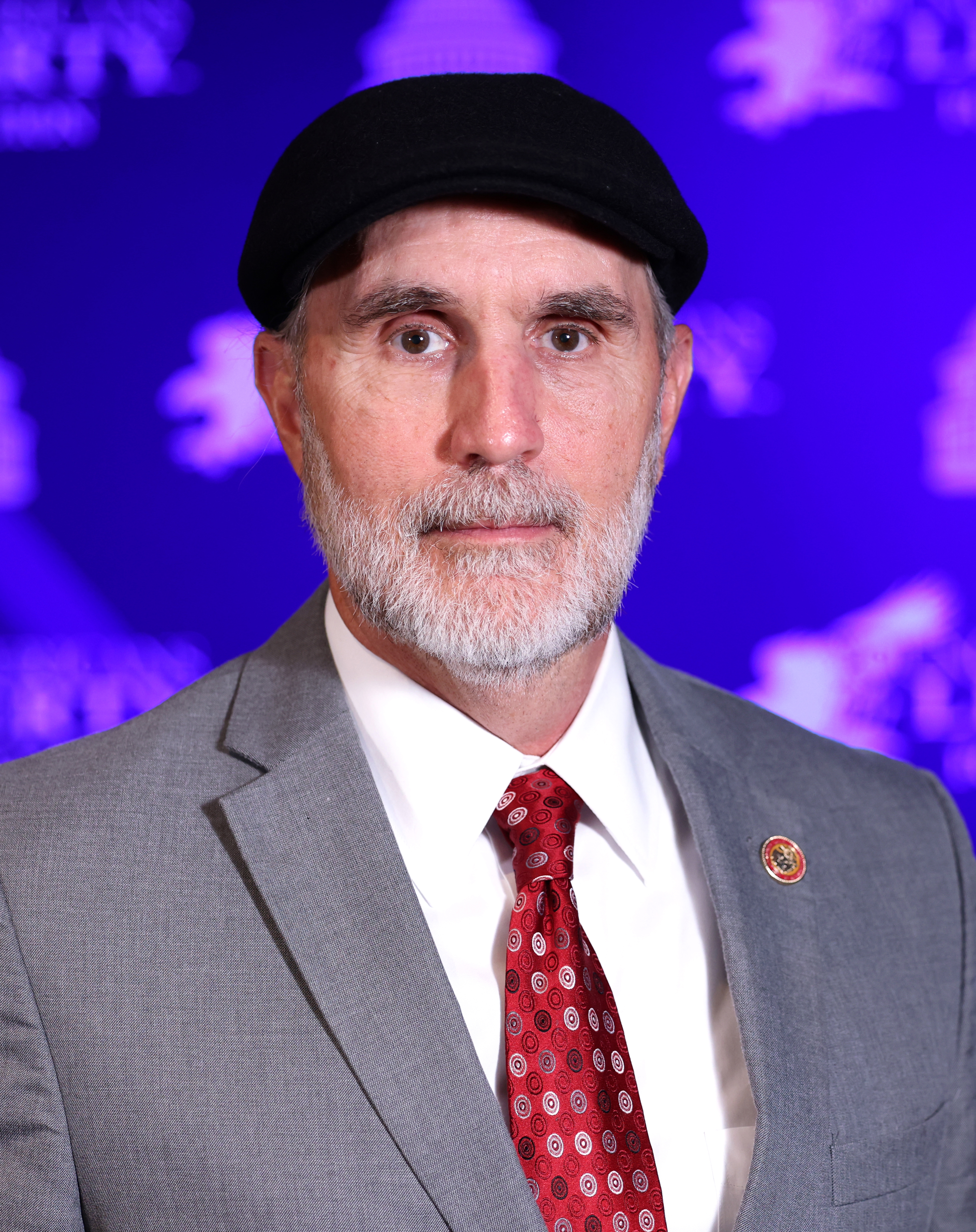
- Long at the 2024 Hazlitt Summit hosted by Young Americans for Liberty Foundation

Member of the Arkansas House of Representatives from the 39th district
- Incumbent
- Assumed office January 9, 2023
- Preceded by: Mark Lowery

Personal details
- Party: Republican

Wayne Long is an American politician. He serves as a Republican member for the 39th district of the Arkansas House of Representatives.

== Life and career ==
Long lived in Bradford, Arkansas. Long is a former Jackson County justice of the peace.

=== Elections ===
In 2022, Long ran for the Arkansas House of Representatives in District 39, challenging incumbent Republican Craig Christiansen of Bald Knob, who had been redistricted from District 47, and Independence County Judge Robert Griffin of Newark. In the May 2022 Republican primary, Long advanced to a runoff against Griffin, with Griffin receiving 1,656 votes (39.66%), Long receiving 1,336 voted (32%), and Christiansen receiving 1,183 votes (28.34%). In June 2022, Long defeated Robert Griffin in the Republican primary runoff election for the 39th district of the Arkansas House of Representatives. In November 2022, he defeated Clayton Hall in the general election, winning 87 percent of the votes. He succeeded Mark Lowery. He assumed office on January 9, 2023.

Long will face Republican Cody Smith, the former Independence County Republican Committee Chairman, in the 2026 Republican primary for the 39th district.

=== Tenure as State Representative ===
In late February 2025, Long proposed HB1564 - TO MODIFY MOTOR VEHICLE RACING FACILITY PERMITS AND TO SET CERTAIN RESTRICTIONS ON A MOTOR VEHICLE RACING FACILITY IN CERTAIN RURAL LOCATIONS; AND TO DECLARE AN EMERGENCY. with senator Ronald Caldwell, which would have placed new permit requirements, time and decibel-based noise restrictions, mandated liability insurance, and daily non-compliance fines for motorsports facilities operating in rural areas. The bill was strongly opposed by the Specialty Equipment Market Association and the Performance Racing Industry over concerns regarding its impact on local economies. The bill was later withdrawn on March 5.

In February 2025, Long sponsored HB1481 - TO CREATE THE ANTI-ATF COMMANDEERING ACT; TO PROHIBIT THE PROVISION OF MATERIAL AID AND SUPPORT FOR ENFORCEMENT OF FEDERAL FIREARMS LAWS with Senator Gary Stubblefield, which would have banned state and local officials from cooperating with the ATF and enforcing any current or future federal gun laws. It included repercussions against any cooperating individuals or agencies, including the termination of employment and criminal prosecution of any individual with legal authority who enforces a federal gun law, and loss of funding and legal suits by the state Attorney General's office regarding the actions of agencies; the bill died in committee.

In April 2025, Long proposed HB1974 - TO PROHIBIT STATE ENTITIES FROM EMPLOYING UNAUTHORIZED ALIENS; TO ESTABLISH THE E-VERIFY REQUIREMENT ACT; AND TO REQUIRE STATE ENTITIES TO USE E-VERIFY TO CONFIRM EMPLOYMENT ELIGIBILITY with Senator Matt McKee, which would require state entities to use E-Verify in hiring processes and prohibit illegal immigrants from qualifying for state employment; the bill was passed and became Arkansas Act 948 on April 21.
