= David Ray (politician) =

American politician

Member of the Arkansas House of Representatives from the 69th district
- Incumbent
- Assumed office January 9, 2023
- Preceded by: Aaron Pilkington

Member of the Arkansas House of Representatives from the 40th district
- In office January 11, 2021 – January 9, 2023
- Preceded by: Douglas House
- Succeeded by: Shad Pearce

Personal details
- Party: Republican
- Spouse: Jessica
- Children: 2
- Education: University of the Ozarks (BS)

David Ray is an American politician serving as a member of the Arkansas House of Representatives from the 69th district.

== Early life and education ==
Ray is a native of Maumelle, Arkansas. He earned a Bachelor of Science degree in communications and political science from the University of the Ozarks.

== Electoral history ==
Ray was first elected to the House in the 2020 Arkansas House of Representatives election in the 40th district. He was reelected to the house in the 2022 Arkansas House of Representatives election for the 69th district due to redistricting.

== Career ==
During the 2014 United States Senate election in Arkansas, Ray worked as communications director for the Tom Cotton campaign. He later worked as director of the Arkansas chapter of Americans for Prosperity. From 2017 to 2020, he has been the chief of staff for Lieutenant Governor Tim Griffin.
