= Harlan Breaux =

American politician

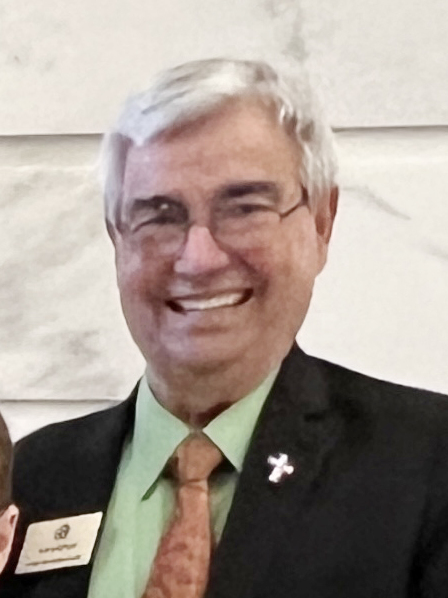
- Breaux in 2023

Member of the Arkansas House of Representatives from the 6th district (Previously 97th district)
- Incumbent
- Assumed office January 1, 2019
- Preceded by: Bob Ballinger
- Succeeded by: Cody Rogers (elect)

Personal details
- Born: Harlan Wayne Breaux; June 6, 1947 (age 79) Cheneyville, Louisiana, U.S.
- Party: Republican
- Spouse: Roxanne
- Children: 1

Harlan Wayne Breaux (born July 6, 1947) is an American politician from the Republican Party. He has served as the Representative from District 6 (previously District 97) in the Arkansas House of Representatives since his being elected in 2018. He previously served in the US Navy and now lives in Holiday Island, Arkansas with his wife, Roxanne, and their daughter.

== Biography ==
Breaux was born on July 6, 1947, in the town of Cheneyville, Louisiana, to Nelson Lee Breaux (1921-1999) and Evelyn Emma Lacaze (1925-2002). He grew up in Louisiana and, before entering politics, sold insurance and worked for an aluminum company in Lake Charles. He became motivated to enter politics after hearing his local preacher talk "about how Christian people really need to step up to the plate and get involved in politics."
