= Steve Hollowell =

American politician

Member of the Arkansas House of Representatives from the 37th district
- Incumbent
- Assumed office January 9, 2023
- Preceded by: Jamie Aleshia Scott

Personal details
- Spouse: Eva
- Education: Arkansas State University
- Occupation: Real Estate

Steve Hollowell is a Republican politician from the U.S. state of Arkansas. He serves in the Arkansas House of Representatives for district 37, a seat he originally won on January 9, 2023. Before that, he was serving the 49th district for three terms, with his first term starting in 2017.

== Biography ==
Hollowell is a Baptist. He served as an alderman for Forrest City from 2003 to 2016.
