= Danny Watson =

American politician

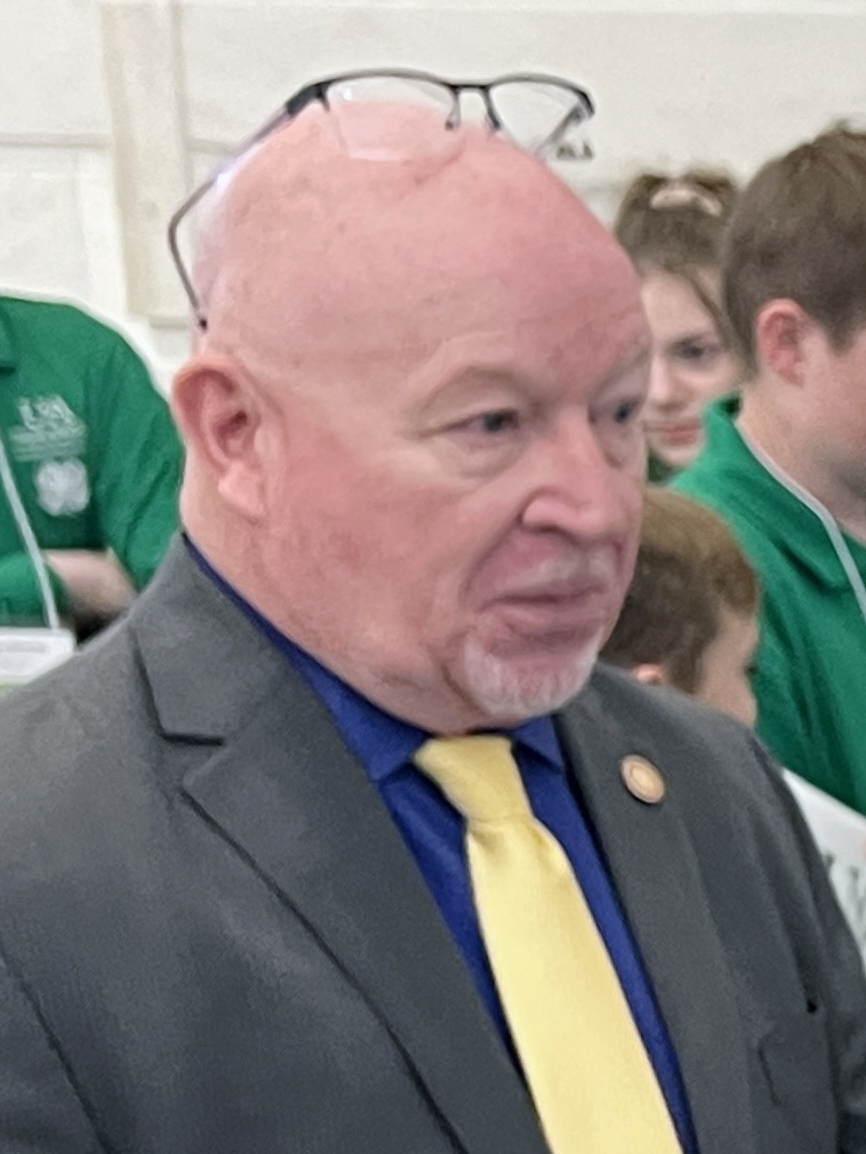
- Watson in 2023

Member of the Arkansas House of Representatives from the 88th district
- Incumbent
- Assumed office January 9, 2023
- Preceded by: Clint Penzo

Member of the Arkansas House of Representatives from the 3rd district
- In office January 1, 2017 – January 9, 2023
- Preceded by: Brent Talley
- Succeeded by: Stetson Painter

Personal details
- Party: Republican
- Spouse: Judy Watson
- Children: 2
- Education: Louisiana Tech University (BS)
- Occupation: Public official

Danny Watson is a Republican member of the Arkansas House of Representatives, representing the 88th district. Watson defeated incumbent Democratic Representative Brent Talley in his failed reelection bid in the general election held on November 8, 2016. Watson began serving his first term in the 91st General Assembly on January 9, 2017 where he serves on the House Revenue and Taxation Committee, the House Aging, Children and Youth, Legislative and Military Affairs Committee, and the Energy Joint Committee. He was elected to the 88th district on November 8, 2022 in the 2022 Arkansas House of Representatives election, and assumed office January 9, 2023.

== Early life and education ==
Watson attended Louisiana Tech University and graduated with a B.S. in Wildlife Management. He then graduated from the Arkansas Law Enforcement Training Academy and spent 15 years in law enforcement. Watson also had a career as a safety director for a trucking company and served on the school board for the Hope School District for 15 years.

== Personal life ==
Watson lives in Hope, Arkansas with his wife Judy Watson. He is a member of the Hope Kiwanis Club, Hempstead County Chamber of Commerce, and Nevada County Chamber of Commerce. Watson also serves on the board of directors for Southwest Arkansas Development Housing Inc. He is a Baptist.
