= Shad Pearce =

American politician

Member of the Arkansas House of Representatives from the 40th district
- Incumbent
- Assumed office January 9, 2023
- Preceded by: David Ray

Personal details
- Party: Republican
- Spouse: Tammy
- Children: Taylor Cothern and Tye
- Education: Bachelor’s Degree in criminology
- Alma mater: Arkansas State University

Shad Pearce is an American politician who has served as a member of the Arkansas House of Representatives since January 9, 2023. He represents Arkansas' 40th House district. He is a former Independence County Sheriff.

== Electoral history ==
He was elected on November 8, 2022, in the 2022 Arkansas House of Representatives election unopposed. He assumed office on January 9, 2023.

== Personal life ==
Pearce is a Baptist.

Arkansas House of Representatives
Preceded by David Ray	Member of the Arkansas House of Representatives; 2023–present	Succeeded by incumbent
