= Steven Walker (politician) =

American politician

Member of the Arkansas House of Representatives from the 27th district
- Incumbent
- Assumed office January 9, 2023
- Preceded by: Julie Mayberry

Personal details
- Born: Salem, Arkansas
- Party: Republican
- Education: Master of Science in educational leadership, Associate of Arts in general education, Bachelor of Science in mid-level education
- Alma mater: Ozarka College, Arkansas State University

Steven Walker is an American politician who has served as a member of the Arkansas House of Representatives since January 9, 2023. He represents Arkansas' 27th House district.

== Electoral history ==
He was elected on November 8, 2022 in the 2022 Arkansas House of Representatives election. He assumed office on January 9, 2023.

== Biography ==
Walker earned an Associate of Arts in general education from Ozarka College, a Bachelor of Science in mid-level education from Arkansas State University, and a Master of Science in educational leadership. Outside of politics, he works as a science teacher. He is a Christian.

== Political positions ==
Walker describes himself as anti-abortion.

Arkansas House of Representatives
Preceded by Julie Mayberry	Member of the Arkansas House of Representatives; 2023–present	Succeeded by incumbent
