= Marcus Richmond =

American politician

Majority Leader of the Arkansas House of Representatives
- In office January 9, 2023 – January 13, 2025
- Preceded by: Austin McCollum
- Succeeded by: Howard Beaty
- In office March 26, 2018 – January 11, 2021
- Preceded by: Mathew Pitsch
- Succeeded by: Austin McCollum

Member of the Arkansas House of Representatives from the 21st district
- Incumbent
- Assumed office January 12, 2015
- Preceded by: Terry Rice

Personal details
- Born: May 4, 1956 (age 70) Mena, Arkansas, U.S.
- Party: Republican
- Education: Arkansas Tech University (BS)

Military service
- Branch/service: United States Marine Corps
- Years of service: 1978–1998
- Rank: Lieutenant Colonel

Marcus E. Richmond (born May 4, 1956) is an American politician serving as a member of the Arkansas House of Representatives for the 21st district. Elected in November 2014, he assumed office on January 12, 2015.

== Early life and education ==
Richmond was born in Mena, Arkansas. He earned a Bachelor of Science degree in health and physical education from Arkansas Tech University.

== Career ==
Richmond served in the United States Marine Corps from 1978 to 1998, retiring with the rank of lieutenant colonel. From 1998 to 2000, he worked as a football coach at the Hargrave Military Academy. Richmond was the president and CEO of America's Pet Registry and operated a ranch with his brother. Richmond was elected to the Arkansas House of Representatives in November 2014 and assumed office on January 12, 2015. During the 2017 legislative session, he served as vice chair of the House Public Transportation.

Arkansas House of Representatives
Preceded by Mathew Pitsch	Majority Leader of the Arkansas House of Representatives; 2018–2021	Succeeded by Austin McCollum
Preceded by Austin McCollum	Majority Leader of the Arkansas House of Representatives; 2023–2025	Succeeded by Howard Beaty
