= Les Warren (politician) =

American politician

Member of the Arkansas House of Representatives from the 25th district
- In office January 9, 2017 – January 9, 2023
- Preceded by: John Vines
- Succeeded by: Chad Puryear

Member of the Arkansas House of Representatives from the 84th district
- Incumbent
- Assumed office January 9, 2023
- Preceded by: Denise Garner

Personal details
- Born: Leslie Allen Warren Smackover, Arkansas, U.S.
- Party: Republican
- Spouse: Pam
- Children: 2
- Education: University of Arkansas (MA)

Leslie Allen "Les" Warren is an American politician serving as a member of the Arkansas House of Representatives from the 84th district. Elected in November 2016, he assumed office in January 2017.

== Early life and education ==
Warren was born in Smackover, Arkansas. He earned a master's degree from the University of Arkansas.

== Career ==
Outside of politics, Warren is the president of the Hot Springs Title Company. He also served on the board of the Lakeside School District and was a member of the Greater Hot Springs Chamber of Commerce. He was elected to the Arkansas House of Representatives in November 2016 and assumed office in January 2017. Since 2019, Warren has also served as chair of the House Public Retirement and Social Security Programs Committee.
