= Stetson Painter =

American politician

Member of the Arkansas House of Representatives from the 3rd district
- Incumbent
- Assumed office January 9, 2023
- Preceded by: Danny Watson

Personal details
- Party: Republican
- Spouse: Kaleigh
- Children: 1
- Education: Bachelor's degree in criminology, Master's degree in public administration
- Alma mater: Arkansas State University

Stetson Painter is an American politician who has served as a member of the Arkansas House of Representatives since January 9, 2023. He represents Arkansas' 3rd House district.

== Electoral history ==
He was elected on November 8, 2022, in the 2022 Arkansas House of Representatives election against Libertarian opponent Steven Gene Parsons. He assumed office on January 9, 2023.

== Biography ==
Painter obtained a Bachelor's degree in criminology in 2013 and a Master's degree in public administration in 2016 from Arkansas State University. He was also a Congressional staffer for Congressman Rick Crawford. He also served in the United States Army Reserve. He is a Born again Baptist.

Alabama House of Representatives
Preceded by Danny Watson	Member of the Arkansas House of Representatives; 2023–present	Succeeded by incumbent
