= Jeremiah Moore (politician) =

American politician

Member of the Arkansas House of Representatives from the 61st district
- Incumbent
- Assumed office January 9, 2023
- Preceded by: Marsh Davis

Personal details
- Party: Republican
- Education: John Brown University
- Occupation: Real estate broker

Jeremiah Moore is an American statesman and real estate broker who has served as a member of the Arkansas House of Representatives from the 61st district since 2023. He is a member of the Republican Party.

== Biography ==
Moore earned a degree in marketing from John Brown University in 2016. He became an agricultural and recreational real estate broker.

Moore was first elected to the Arkansas House of Representatives in 2022, receiving 68.1% of the vote in the 61st district.
