= Ryan Rose =

American politician

Ryan A. Rose

Member of the Arkansas House of Representatives from the 48th district
- Incumbent
- Assumed office January 9, 2023

Personal details
- Party: Republican
- Spouse: Tiffany
- Children: 3
- Education: University of the Ozarks (Bachelor of Arts)

Ryan A. Rose is an American politician serving as a member of the Arkansas House of Representatives from the 48th district. Elected in November 2022, he assumed office on January 9, 2023.

== Early life and education ==
Rose resides in Van Buren, Arkansas. He was born in Missouri City, Texas and raised on the island of Port Aransas, Texas. Rose is a graduate of Port Aransas High School. He earned a Bachelor of Arts degree in communications from the University of the Ozarks in Clarksville, AR.

== Career ==
Since 2008, Rose has been a minister in the Arkansas River Valley, currently serving as the Senior Pastor of Victory Church in Fort Smith and previous serving as a Pastor on staff at Butterfield Church in Van Buren, AR and Evangel Temple in Fort Smith, AR.

In 2014, Rose opened Rose Auto Sales, an Arkansas River Valley pre-owned car dealership. From August 2016 through July 2024 also worked with Union Christian Academy as a High School Teacher and as a Marketing and Development Director.

Additionally, Rose was the Arkansas Men's Ministry Director for the Arkansas Assemblies of God in 2022 and 2023 and has served as the President, Vice-President and a board member of Heart to Heart Pregnancy and Family Care Center in Fort Smith since 2018. Rose is a member of the National Rifle Association, the Van Buren Chamber of Commerce, and the Crawford County GOP. Rose and his wife Tiffany currently reside in Van Buren with their three children.

Rose was elected to the Arkansas House of Representatives in November 2022 and assumed office on January 9, 2023. He was re-elected in November 2024.

== Arkansas House of Representatives ==
Rose ran unopposed in Republican primary election for the Arkansas House of Representatives District 48 seat on March 5, 2024. Rose also ran unopposed and won 100% of the vote (7,646 votes) in the general election for the 48th district on November 5, 2024.

Rose won the Republican primary election for the Arkansas House of Representatives District 48 seat on May 24, 2022, winning more than 56% of the votes. Rose won the general election for the 48th district on November 8, 2022, running unopposed, winning 100% of the vote.

=== 95th Arkansas General Assembly (2024-2025) ===
During the 95th Assembly, Rose served on the following committees:

- Vice-Chair ALC-Personnel
- Arkansas Legislative Council (ALC)
  - Occupational Licensing Review Subcommittee
  - Charitable, Penal, and Correctional Institutions
  - Highway Commission Review and Advisory Subcommittee
- House Public Health, Welfare and Labor
  - House Human Services Subcommittee
- House State Agencies & Governmental Affairs
  - House Elections Subcommittee
- Advanced Communications & Information Technology
- Boys State
- Public Retirement and Social Security Programs-Joint

=== 94th Arkansas General Assembly (2023–2024) ===
During the 94th Assembly, Rose served on the following committees:

- House Public Health, Welfare and Labor
  - House Labor & Environment Subcommittee - Vice-Chair
- House Insurance & Commerce
  - House Utilities Subcommittee - Vice-Chair
- Joint Budget Committee
  - Administrative Rule Review Subcommittee
  - Peer Review
