= Tony Furman =

American politician

Member of the Arkansas House of Representatives from the 28th district
- In office January 11, 2021 – January 9, 2023
- Preceded by: Kim Hammer
- Succeeded by: Bart Schultz

Member of the Arkansas House of Representatives from the 82nd district
- Incumbent
- Assumed office January 9, 2023
- Preceded by: Mark Berry

Personal details
- Born: Anthony Furman
- Party: Republican
- Spouse: Lorin
- Children: 2
- Education: Henderson State University (BA)

Tony Furman is an American politician and real estate agent serving as a member of the Arkansas House of Representatives from the 28th district.

== Electoral history ==
He was first elected to the house unnoposed on November 3, 2020 in the 2020 Arkansas House of Representatives election to the 28th district. In 2022 he was elected to the 82nd district due to redistricting.

== Education ==
Furman graduated from Glen Rose High School in Malvern, Arkansas and earned a Bachelor of Arts degree in political science from Henderson State University.

== Career ==
Outside of politics, Furman works as a real estate agent for Crye-Leike Realtors. He was elected to the Arkansas House of Representatives in November 2020 and assumed office on January 11, 2021.
