= Milton Nicks Jr. =

American politician and law enforcement officer

Milton Nicks

Member of the Arkansas House of Representatives from the 50th district
- In office January 12, 2015 – January 13, 2025
- Preceded by: Fred Smith
- Succeeded by: Jessie McGruder

Personal details
- Party: Democratic
- Spouse: Joann
- Children: 4

Milton Nicks Jr. is an American politician and former law enforcement officer who was a member of the Arkansas House of Representatives from the 50th district. Elected in November 2014, he assumed office on January 12, 2015. In 2022, Nicks ran for Arkansas House of Representatives, but this time in the 35th district and won. He served from 2023-2025.

== Early life and education ==
Nicks was born and raised in Earle, Arkansas. He graduated from the Arkansas State Police Academy and Arkansas Law Enforcement Training Academy.

== Career ==
Prior to entering politics, Nicks served as an Arkansas State Police officer. He was also the owner and CEO of a construction company and worked as the pastor of the Mount Pilgrim Baptist Church.

Nicks was elected to the Arkansas House of Representatives to represent the 50th district, which he served from 2015 to 2023. In 2022, Nicks ran for the 35th District and won the seat.

In July 2023, Nicks announced he'd not run for re-election once his term ended in 2025.

As of 2026, Nicks currently resides in Marion, Arkansas. He has a wife and four children.
