= Rick McClure =

American politician

Member of the Arkansas House of Representatives from the 29th district
- Incumbent
- Assumed office January 11, 2021

Personal details
- Party: Republican

Rick McClure is an American politician serving as a member of the Arkansas House of Representatives from the 29th district.

== Career ==
McClure won the primary election for district 26 of the Arkansas House of Representatives on March 3, 2020, winning 2,392 votes to 1,120 to Lorna Nobles. McClure won the general election on November 3, 2020, winning 8,327 votes to 3,304 against Joyce Schimenti.

=== 93rd Arkansas General Assembly ===
McClure began serving as a representative on January 11, 2021. During the 93rd Assembly, McClure served on the following committees:

- House Revenue and Taxation Committee
- Advanced Communications and Information Technology Committee
- Aging, Children and Youth, Legislative and Military Affairs Committee

McClure is running for re-election in 2022.
