= Rebecca Burkes =

American politician

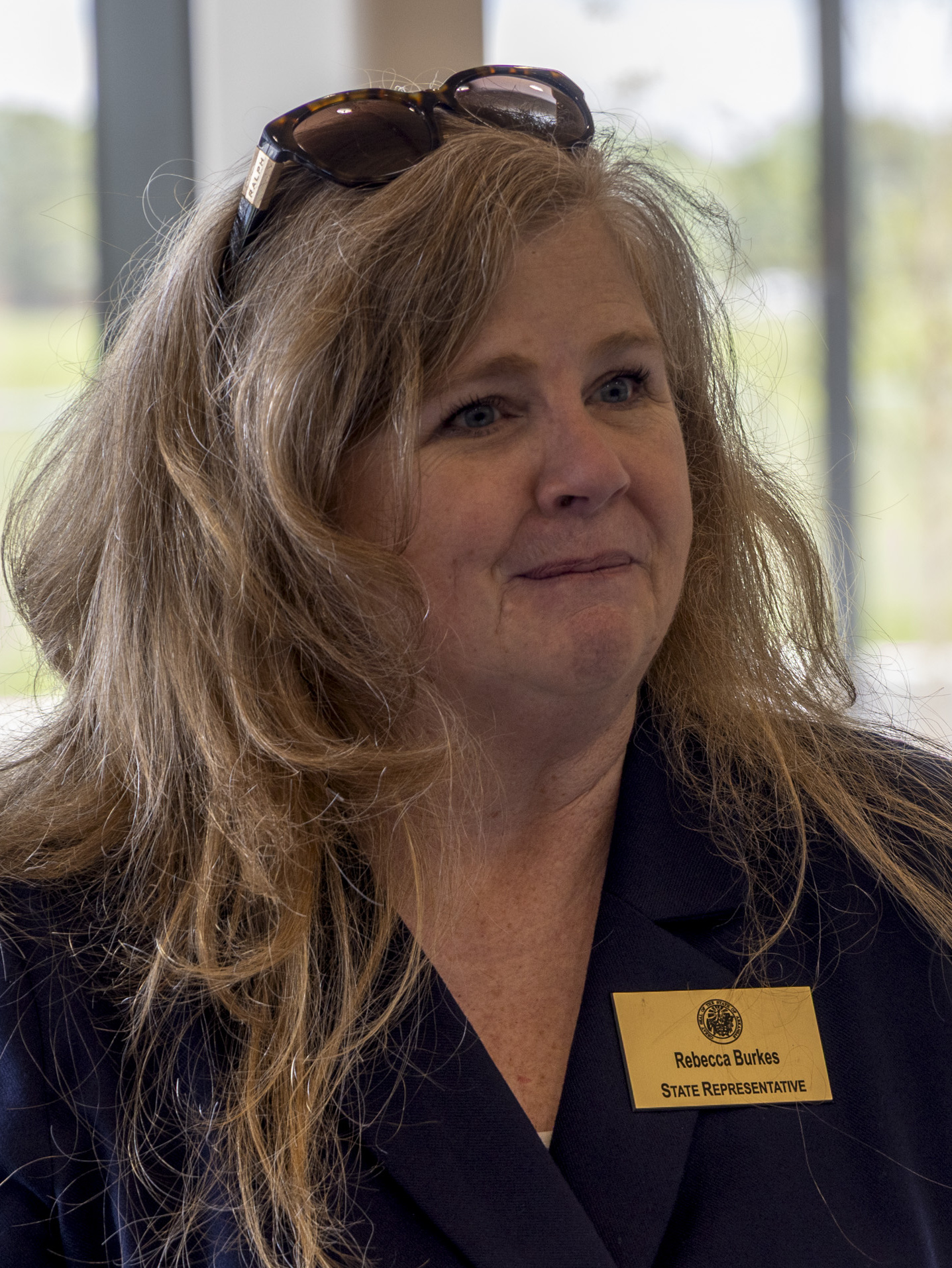
- Burkes in 2025

Member of the Arkansas House of Representatives from the 11th district
- Incumbent
- Assumed office January 9, 2023
- Preceded by: Megan Godfrey

Personal details
- Born: circa 1968
- Party: Republican
- Spouse: Aaron Burkes
- Education: University of Texas (BA); University of Arkansas (MS); Baylor University (JD)
- Profession: Attorney and Business Owner

Rebecca Burkes (born 1968) is an American politician who has served as a member of the Arkansas House of Representatives since January 9, 2023. She is a Republican and represents Arkansas' 11th House district.

== Electoral history ==
She was elected on November 8, 2022, in the 2022 Arkansas House of Representatives election against Democratic opponent Rey Hernandez. She assumed office on January 9, 2023.

== Biography ==
Burkes grew up in Richardson, Texas. She earned a Bachelor of Arts from the University of Texas, a Master of Science in Operations Management from the University of Arkansas, and a Juris Doctor from Baylor University. She worked as a faculty member at the University of Wisconsin Law School and as Deputy Director and General Counsel for the Arkansas Department of Heritage.

She married Aaron Burkes, a former Arkansas state representative and current CEO of the Northwest Arkansas National Airport.

Arkansas House of Representatives
Preceded by Megan Godfrey	Member of the Arkansas House of Representatives; 2023–present	Succeeded by incumbent
