= Joy Springer =

American politician

Member of the Arkansas House of Representatives from the 34th district
- Incumbent
- Assumed office March 2020

Personal details
- Born: Ouachita County, Arkansas, U.S.
- Party: Democratic
- Education: Henderson State University (BS); University of Arkansas at Little Rock (BS, MEd)

Joy C. Springer is an American politician currently serving as a member of the Arkansas House of Representatives from the 34th district. A Democrat, she won a special election to succeed John W. Walker and assumed office in March 2020.

== Early life and education ==
Springer was born in Ouachita County, Arkansas. She earned a Bachelor of Science degree in business administration from Henderson State University, followed by a Bachelor of Science in elementary education and a Master of Education from the University of Arkansas at Little Rock.

== Career ==
Springer is an office manager and paralegal. She was first elected to the Arkansas House of Representatives in a March 4, 2020 special election, succeeding John W. Walker, who died in office. She is a life member of the NAACP.

== Personal life ==
Springer is a member of the African Methodist Episcopal Church.
