= Howard Beaty =

American politician

Majority Leader of the Arkansas House of Representatives
- Incumbent
- Assumed office January 13, 2025
- Preceded by: Marcus Richmond

Member of the Arkansas House of Representatives
- Incumbent
- Assumed office January 2021
- Preceded by: LeAnne Burch
- Constituency: 9th district (2021–2023); 95th district (2023–present)

Personal details
- Party: Republican
- Education: Louisiana Tech University (BS)

Howard M. Beaty Jr. is a banker and state legislator in Arkansas. He serves in the Arkansas House of Representatives, representing the 9th District. Beaty lives in Crossett, Arkansas. He is a Republican. Beaty was elected as house majority leader for the 2025 legislative session.

Arkansas House of Representatives
| Preceded by Marcus Richmond | Majority Leader of the Arkansas House of Representatives; 2025–present | Incumbent |
