= Delia Haak =

American politician

Delia J. Haak is a Republican state legislator in Arkansas. She represents the 17th District covering part of Benton County, Arkansas in the Arkansas House of Representatives. She has worked at John Brown University since 1985. She is married and owns a farm with her husband. She graduated from John Brown University and then the University of Arkansas.

She won the seat previously held by Dan M. Douglas who retired from the House. She supports school choice.
