= 2024 United States House of Representatives elections in Arkansas =

- November 5, 2024

All 4 Arkansas seats to the United States House of Representatives
	Majority party	Minority party
Party	Republican	Democratic
Last election	4	0
Seats won	4	0
Seat change	Steady	Steady
Popular vote	764,367	358,749
Percentage	66.77%	31.34%
Swing	▼0.04%	▲0.98%

Republican
40–50%
50–60%
60–70%
70–80%
80–90%
Democratic
40–50%
50–60%

The 2024 United States House of Representatives elections in Arkansas were held on November 5, 2024, to elect the four U.S. representatives from the State of Arkansas, one for each of the state's four congressional districts. The elections coincided with the 2024 U.S. presidential election, as well as other elections to the House of Representatives, elections to the United States Senate, and various state and local elections. The primary election took place on March 5, 2024, and, if necessary, the runoff election was scheduled for April 2, 2024.

== Overview ==
=== District ===
District	Republican		Democratic		Libertarian		Total		Result
District	Votes	%	Votes	%	Votes	%	Votes	%	Result
District 1	194,711	72.88%	64,113	24.00%	8,353	3.13%	267,177	100.00%	Republican hold
District 2	180,509	58.93%	125,777	41.07%	0	0.00%	306,286	100.00%	Republican hold
District 3	192,101	63.80%	95,652	31.77%	13,331	4.43%	301,084	100.00%	Republican hold
District 4	197,046	72.91%	73,207	27.09%	0	0.00%	270,253	100.00%	Republican hold
Total	764,367	66.77%	358,749	31.34%	21,684	1.89%	1,144,800	100.00%	

Popular vote
Republican	66.77%
Democratic	31.34%
Libertarian	1.89%

House seats
Republican	100.00%

=== County ===
County	Republican		Democratic		Libertarian		Margin		Total
County	#	%	#	%	#	%	#	%	Total
Arkansas	3,983	73.23%	1,320	24.27%	136	2.50%	2,663	48.96%	5,439
Ashley	5,168	76.21%	1,613	23.79%	0	0.00%	3,555	52.43%	6,781
Baxter	15,836	77.43%	3,774	18.45%	842	4.12%	12,062	58.98%	20,452
Benton	82,731	65.45%	37,908	29.99%	5,770	4.56%	44,823	35.46%	126,409
Boone	13,449	81.03%	2,524	15.21%	625	3.77%	10,925	65.82%	16,598
Bradley	2,263	72.53%	857	27.47%	0	0.00%	1,406	45.06%	3,120
Calhoun	1,660	82.22%	359	17.78%	0	0.00%	1,301	64.44%	2,019
Carroll	7,407	65.50%	3,404	30.10%	497	4.40%	4,003	35.40%	11,308
Chicot	1,690	49.17%	1,698	49.40%	49	1.43%	-8	-0.23%	3,437
Clark	4,790	63.97%	2,698	36.03%	0	0.00%	2,092	27.94%	7,488
Clay	3,905	81.47%	737	15.38%	151	3.15%	3,168	66.10%	4,793
Cleburne	10,401	83.11%	2,114	16.89%	0	0.00%	8,287	66.22%	12,515
Cleveland	2,787	85.94%	456	14.06%	0	0.00%	2,331	71.88%	3,243
Columbia	5,397	71.38%	2,164	28.62%	0	0.00%	3,233	42.76%	7,561
Conway	5,877	69.95%	2,525	30.05%	0	0.00%	3,352	39.90%	8,402
Craighead	25,736	70.06%	9,777	26.61%	1,223	3.33%	15,959	43.44%	36,736
Crawford	16,268	78.32%	3,471	16.71%	1,031	4.96%	12,797	61.61%	20,770
Crittenden	7,067	49.47%	6,863	48.04%	356	2.49%	204	1.43%	14,286
Cross	4,759	74.74%	1,445	22.70%	163	2.56%	3,314	52.05%	6,367
Dallas	1,472	66.67%	736	33.33%	0	0.00%	736	33.33%	2,208
Desha	1,843	54.54%	1,477	43.71%	59	1.75%	366	10.83%	3,379
Drew	4,318	69.43%	1,901	30.57%	0	0.00%	2,417	38.86%	6,219
Faulkner	35,603	66.36%	18,048	33.64%	0	0.00%	17,555	32.72%	53,651
Franklin	5,700	84.01%	1,085	15.99%	0	0.00%	4,615	68.02%	6,785
Fulton	3,933	79.84%	797	16.18%	196	3.98%	3,136	63.66%	4,926
Garland	29,186	72.33%	11,165	27.67%	0	0.00%	18,021	44.66%	40,351
Grant	6,848	86.63%	1,057	13.37%	0	0.00%	5,791	73.26%	7,905
Greene	12,465	80.68%	2,522	16.32%	463	3.00%	9,943	64.36%	15,450
Hempstead	4,278	72.76%	1,602	27.24%	0	0.00%	2,676	45.51%	5,880
Hot Spring	9,372	78.63%	2,547	21.37%	0	0.00%	6,825	57.26%	11,919
Howard	3,278	76.23%	1,022	23.77%	0	0.00%	2,256	52.47%	4,300
Independence	11,037	80.33%	2,307	16.79%	396	2.88%	8,730	63.54%	13,740
Izard	4,784	82.67%	812	14.03%	191	3.30%	3,972	68.64%	5,787
Jackson	3,533	75.54%	1,011	21.62%	133	2.84%	2,522	53.92%	4,677
Jefferson	9,162	44.06%	11,632	55.94%	0	0.00%	-2,470	-11.88%	20,794
Johnson	6,864	78.21%	1,912	21.79%	0	0.00%	4,952	56.43%	8,776
Lafayette	1,601	72.54%	606	27.46%	0	0.00%	995	45.08%	2,207
Lawrence	4,664	83.15%	791	14.10%	154	2.75%	3,873	69.05%	5,609
Lee	1,183	48.34%	1,197	48.92%	67	2.74%	-14	-0.57%	2,447
Lincoln	2,455	74.03%	779	23.49%	82	2.47%	1,676	50.54%	3,316
Little River	3,759	79.44%	973	20.56%	0	0.00%	2,786	58.88%	4,732
Logan	6,703	83.63%	1,312	16.37%	0	0.00%	5,391	67.26%	8,015
Lonoke	22,931	76.23%	6,079	20.21%	1,071	3.56%	16,852	56.02%	30,081
Madison	5,761	78.15%	1,257	17.05%	354	4.80%	4,504	61.10%	7,372
Marion	6,065	79.32%	1,292	16.90%	289	3.78%	4,773	62.42%	7,646
Miller	11,846	77.42%	3,454	22.58%	0	0.00%	8,392	54.85%	15,300
Mississippi	7,071	68.08%	3,091	29.76%	225	2.17%	3,980	38.32%	10,387
Monroe	1,411	59.39%	898	37.79%	67	2.82%	513	21.59%	2,376
Montgomery	3,007	84.42%	555	15.58%	0	0.00%	2,452	68.84%	3,562
Nevada	2,004	71.85%	785	28.15%	0	0.00%	1,219	43.71%	2,789
Newton	2,989	83.10%	608	16.90%	0	0.00%	2,381	66.19%	3,597
Ouachita	5,233	62.49%	3,141	37.51%	0	0.00%	2,092	24.98%	8,374
Perry	3,451	77.22%	1,018	22.78%	0	0.00%	2,433	54.44%	4,469
Phillips	2,215	46.75%	2,449	51.69%	74	1.56%	-234	-4.94%	4,738
Pike	3,742	88.03%	509	11.97%	0	0.00%	3,233	76.05%	4,251
Poinsett	5,689	82.13%	1,062	15.33%	176	2.54%	4,627	66.80%	6,927
Polk	7,069	87.68%	993	12.32%	0	0.00%	6,076	75.37%	8,062
Pope	18,761	79.14%	4,945	20.86%	0	0.00%	13,816	58.28%	23,706
Prairie	2,606	83.42%	455	14.56%	63	2.02%	2,151	68.85%	3,124
Pulaski	58,715	40.79%	85,131	59.14%	95	0.07%	-26,416	-18.35%	143,941
Randolph	5,284	81.87%	943	14.61%	227	3.52%	4,341	67.26%	6,454
Saline	39,865	70.52%	16,662	29.48%	0	0.00%	23,203	41.05%	56,527
Scott	2,881	88.54%	373	11.46%	0	0.00%	2,508	77.07%	3,254
Searcy	3,154	83.66%	468	12.41%	148	3.93%	2,686	71.25%	3,770
Sebastian	31,193	69.99%	11,484	25.77%	1,892	4.25%	19,709	44.22%	44,569
Sevier	3,801	82.76%	792	17.24%	0	0.00%	3,009	65.51%	4,593
Sharp	5,901	81.02%	1,146	15.74%	236	3.24%	4,755	65.29%	7,283
St. Francis	2,884	49.39%	2,853	48.86%	102	1.75%	31	0.53%	5,839
Stone	4,672	79.67%	962	16.41%	230	3.92%	3,710	63.27%	5,864
Union	10,398	69.27%	4,613	30.73%	0	0.00%	5,785	38.54%	15,011
Van Buren	5,843	78.85%	1,567	21.15%	0	0.00%	4,276	57.71%	7,410
Washington	52,408	55.22%	38,710	40.79%	3,787	3.99%	13,698	14.43%	94,905
White	23,591	80.59%	5,683	19.41%	0	0.00%	17,908	61.17%	29,274
Woodruff	1,538	67.75%	668	29.43%	64	2.82%	870	38.33%	2,270
Yell	5,173	82.40%	1,105	17.60%	0	0.00%	4,068	64.80%	6,278
Totals	764,367	66.77%	358,749	31.34%	21,684	1.89%	405,618	35.43%	1,144,800

=== Counties that flipped from Republican to Democratic ===
- Lee (largest city: Marianna)

== District 1 ==
2024 Arkansas's 1st congressional district election
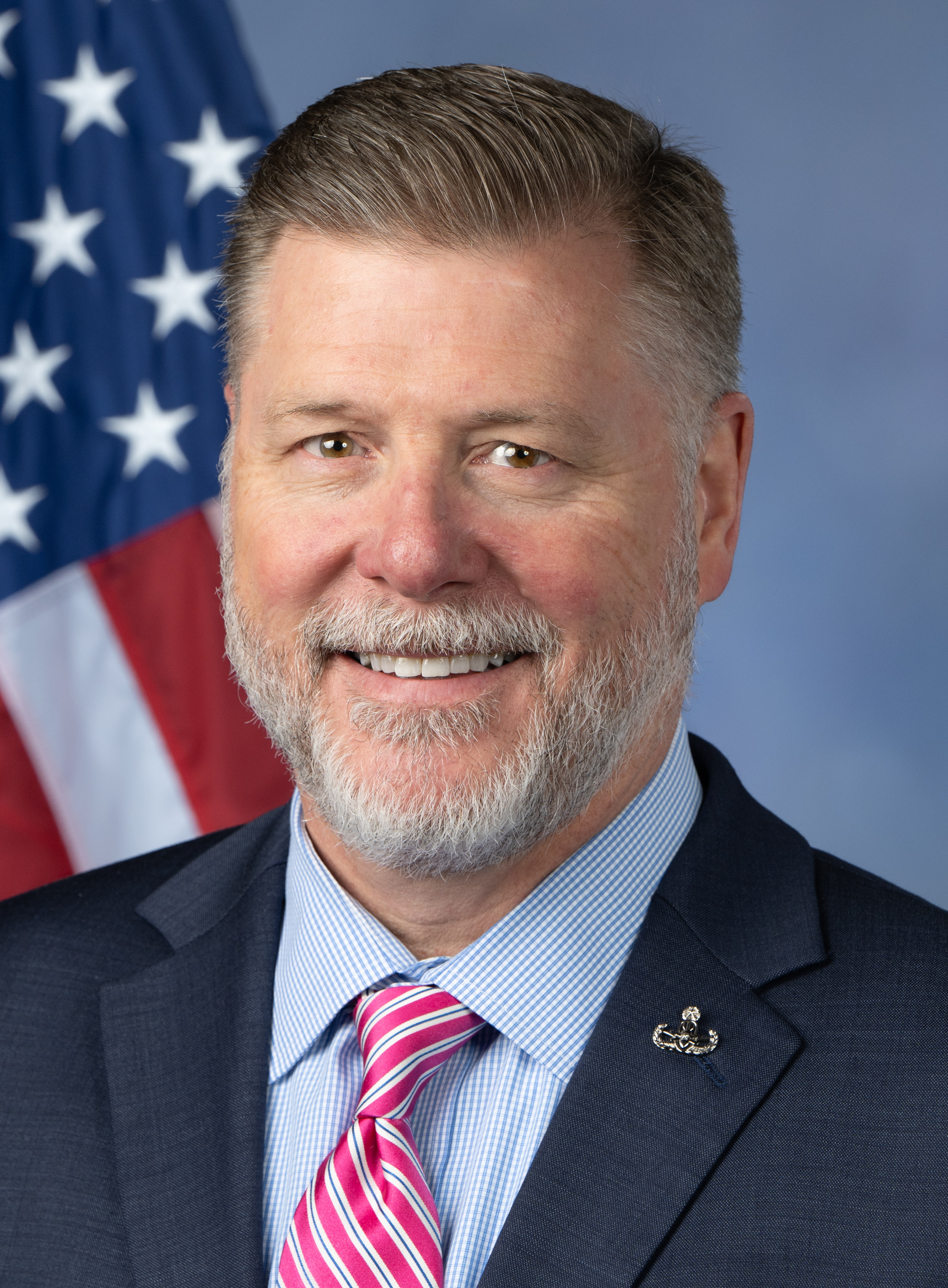

Nominee	Rick Crawford	Rodney Govens
Party	Republican	Democratic
Popular vote	194,711	64,113
Percentage	72.9%	24.0%
- Crawford: 40–50% 50–60% 60–70% 70–80% 80–90% Govens: 40–50% 50–60% 60–70%
U.S. Representative before election
Rick Crawford
Republican
Elected U.S. Representative
Rick Crawford
Republican

The incumbent was Republican Rick Crawford, who was re-elected with 73.8% of the vote in 2022.

=== Republican primary ===
==== Candidates ====
===== Nominee =====
- Rick Crawford, incumbent U.S. representative

==== Endorsements ====
Rick Crawford

Organizations

- AIPAC
- National Rifle Association Political Victory Fund
- National Right to Life Committee

==== Fundraising ====
Campaign finance reports as of February 14, 2024
Candidate	Raised	Spent	Cash on hand
Rick Crawford (R)	$475,950	$444,498	$653,95
Source: Federal Election Commission

=== Democratic primary ===
==== Candidates ====
===== Nominee =====
- Rodney Govens, foster child advocate

==== Endorsements ====
Rodney Govens

Organizations

- Vote Common Good

Labor unions

- National Education Association

Political parties

- Democratic Party of Arkansas (post-primary)

==== Fundraising ====
Campaign finance reports as of February 14, 2024
Candidate	Raised	Spent	Cash on hand
Rodney Govens (D)	$27,256 (Note: $18,600 of this total was self-funded by Govens.)	$17,299	$9,956
Source: Federal Election Commission

=== Libertarian Party ===
==== Nominee ====
- Steve Parsons, retired economics consultant

=== General election ===
==== Predictions ====
Source	Ranking	As of
The Cook Political Report	Solid R	July 28, 2023
Inside Elections	Solid R	July 28, 2023
Sabato's Crystal Ball	Safe R	June 8, 2023
Elections Daily	Safe R	June 8, 2023
CNalysis	Solid R	November 16, 2023
Decision Desk HQ	Solid R	June 1, 2024

==== Results ====
2024 Arkansas's 1st congressional district election
Party	Candidate	Votes	%
Republican	Rick Crawford (incumbent)	194,711	72.9
Democratic	Rodney Govens	64,113	24.0
Libertarian	Steve Parsons	8,353	3.1
Total votes		267,177	100.0
Republican hold			

==== By county ====
County	Rick Crawford Republican		Rodney Govens Democratic		Steve Parsons Libertarian		Margin		Total
County	#	%	#	%	#	%	#	%	Total
Arkansas	3,983	73.23%	1,320	24.27%	136	2.50%	2,663	48.96%	5,439
Baxter	15,836	77.43%	3,774	18.45%	842	4.12%	12,062	58.98%	20,452
Boone	13,449	81.03%	2,524	15.21%	625	3.77%	10,925	65.82%	16,598
Chicot	1,690	49.17%	1,698	49.40%	49	1.43%	-8	-0.23%	3,437
Clay	3,905	81.47%	737	15.38%	151	3.15%	3,168	66.10%	4,793
Craighead	25,736	70.06%	9,777	26.61%	1,223	3.33%	15,959	43.44%	36,736
Crittenden	7,067	49.47%	6,863	48.04%	356	2.49%	204	1.43%	14,286
Cross	4,759	74.74%	1,445	22.70%	163	2.56%	3,314	52.05%	6,367
Desha	1,843	54.54%	1,477	43.71%	59	1.75%	366	10.83%	3,379
Fulton	3,933	79.84%	797	16.18%	196	3.98%	3,136	63.66%	4,926
Greene	12,465	80.68%	2,522	16.32%	463	3.00%	9,943	64.36%	15,450
Independence	11,037	80.33%	2,307	16.79%	396	2.88%	8,730	63.54%	13,740
Izard	4,784	82.67%	812	14.03%	191	3.30%	3,972	68.64%	5,787
Jackson	3,533	75.54%	1,011	21.62%	133	2.84%	2,522	53.92%	4,677
Lawrence	4,664	83.15%	791	14.10%	154	2.75%	3,873	69.05%	5,609
Lee	1,183	48.34%	1,197	48.92%	67	2.74%	-14	-0.57%	2,447
Lincoln	2,455	74.03%	779	23.49%	82	2.47%	1,676	50.54%	3,316
Lonoke	22,931	76.23%	6,079	20.21%	1,071	3.56%	16,852	56.02%	30,081
Marion	6,065	79.32%	1,292	16.90%	289	3.78%	4,773	62.42%	7,646
Mississippi	7,071	68.08%	3,091	29.76%	225	2.17%	3,980	38.32%	10,387
Monroe	1,411	59.39%	898	37.79%	67	2.82%	513	21.59%	2,376
Phillips	2,215	46.75%	2,449	51.69%	74	1.56%	-234	-4.94%	4,738
Poinsett	5,689	82.13%	1,062	15.33%	176	2.54%	4,627	66.80%	6,927
Prairie	2,606	83.42%	455	14.56%	63	2.02%	2,151	68.85%	3,124
Pulaski (part)	968	32.49%	1,916	64.32%	95	3.19%	-948	-31.82%	2,979
Randolph	5,284	81.87%	943	14.61%	227	3.52%	4,341	67.26%	6,454
Searcy	3,154	83.66%	468	12.41%	148	3.93%	2,686	71.25%	3,770
Sharp	5,901	81.02%	1,146	15.74%	236	3.24%	4,755	65.29%	7,283
St. Francis	2,884	49.39%	2,853	48.86%	102	1.75%	31	0.53%	5,839
Stone	4,672	79.67%	962	16.41%	230	3.92%	3,710	63.27%	5,864
Woodruff	1,538	67.75%	668	29.43%	64	2.82%	870	38.33%	2,270
Totals	194,711	72.88%	64,113	24.00%	8,353	3.13%	130,598	48.88%	267,177

== District 2 ==
2024 Arkansas's 2nd congressional district election
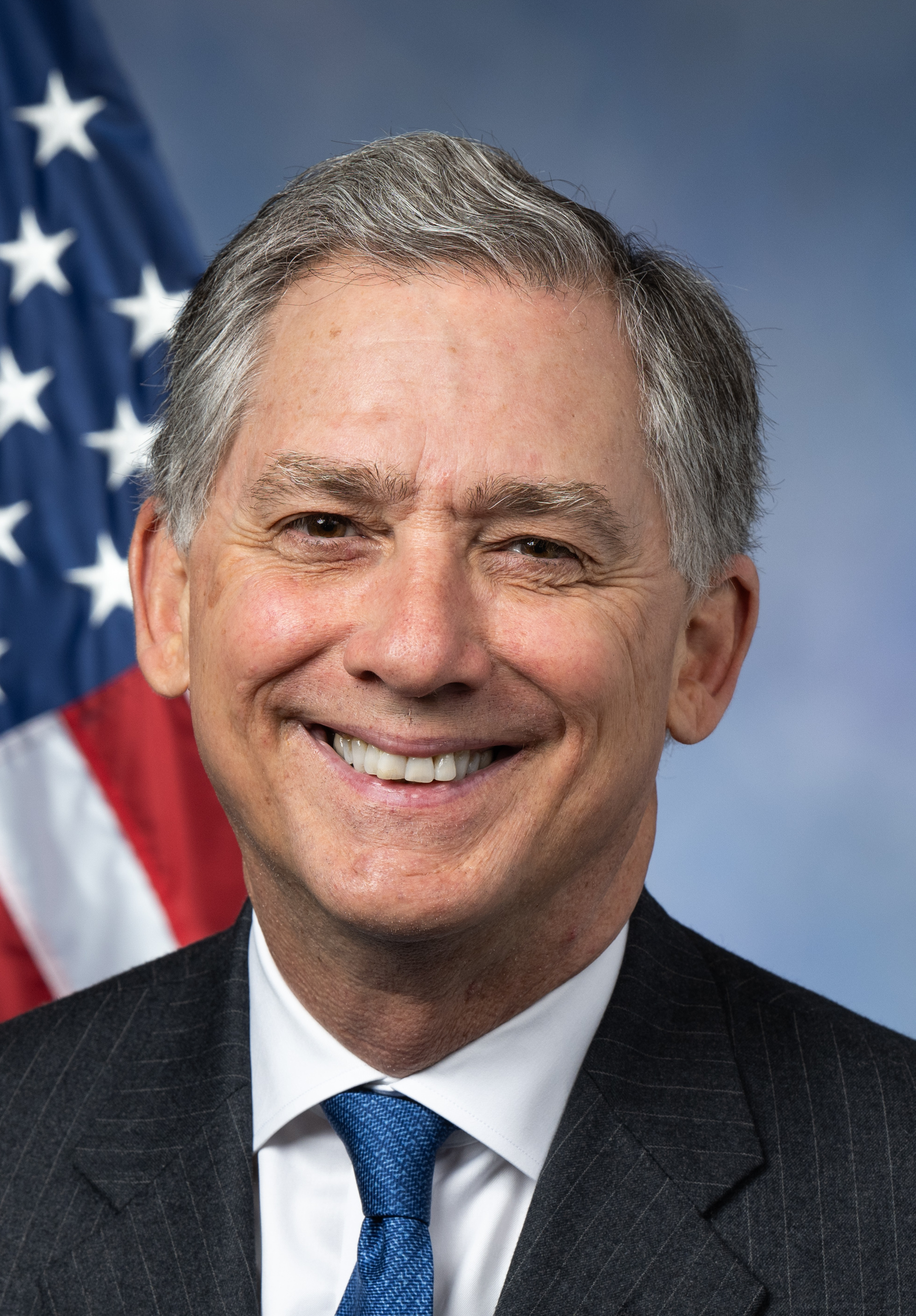

Nominee	French Hill	Marcus Jones
Party	Republican	Democratic
Popular vote	180,509	125,777
Percentage	58.9%	41.1%
- Hill: 60–70% 70–80% 80–90% Jones: 50–60%
U.S. Representative before election
French Hill
Republican
Elected U.S. Representative
French Hill
Republican

The incumbent was Republican French Hill, who was re-elected with 60.0% of the vote in 2022.

=== Republican primary ===
==== Candidates ====
===== Nominee =====
- French Hill, incumbent U.S. representative

==== Endorsements ====
French Hill

Organizations

- AIPAC
- National Rifle Association Political Victory Fund
- National Right to Life Committee

==== Fundraising ====
Campaign finance reports as of February 14, 2024
Candidate	Raised	Spent	Cash on hand
French Hill (R)	$1,705,556	$1,011,440	$1,574,781
Source: Federal Election Commission

=== Democratic primary ===
==== Candidates ====
===== Nominee =====
- Marcus Jones, retired U.S. Army colonel

==== Endorsements ====
Marcus Jones

Labor unions

- National Education Association

Political parties

- Democratic Party of Arkansas (post-primary)

==== Fundraising ====
Campaign finance reports as of February 14, 2024
Candidate	Raised	Spent	Cash on hand
Marcus Jones (D)	$79,020	$53,220	$25,800
Source: Federal Election Commission

=== General election ===
==== Predictions ====
Source	Ranking	As of
The Cook Political Report	Solid R	July 28, 2023
Inside Elections	Solid R	July 28, 2023
Sabato's Crystal Ball	Safe R	June 8, 2023
Elections Daily	Safe R	June 8, 2023
CNalysis	Solid R	November 16, 2023
Decision Desk HQ	Solid R	June 1, 2024

==== Results ====
2024 Arkansas's 2nd congressional district election
Party	Candidate	Votes	%
Republican	French Hill (incumbent)	180,509	58.9
Democratic	Marcus Jones	125,777	41.1
Total votes		306,286	100.0
Republican hold			

==== By county ====
County	French Hill Republican		Marcus Jones Democratic		Margin		Total
County	#	%	#	%	#	%	Total
Cleburne	10,401	83.11%	2,114	16.89%	8,287	66.22%	12,515
Conway	5,877	69.95%	2,525	30.05%	3,352	39.90%	8,402
Faulkner	35,603	66.36%	18,048	33.64%	17,555	32.72%	53,651
Perry	3,451	77.22%	1,018	22.78%	2,433	54.44%	4,469
Pulaski (part)	55,878	41.69%	78,160	58.31%	-22,282	-16.62%	134,038
Saline	39,865	70.52%	16,662	29.48%	23,203	41.05%	56,527
Van Buren	5,843	78.85%	1,567	21.15%	4,276	57.71%	7,410
White	23,591	80.59%	5,683	19.41%	17,908	61.17%	29,274
Totals	180,509	58.93%	125,777	41.07%	54,732	17.87%	306,286

== District 3 ==
2024 Arkansas's 3rd congressional district election
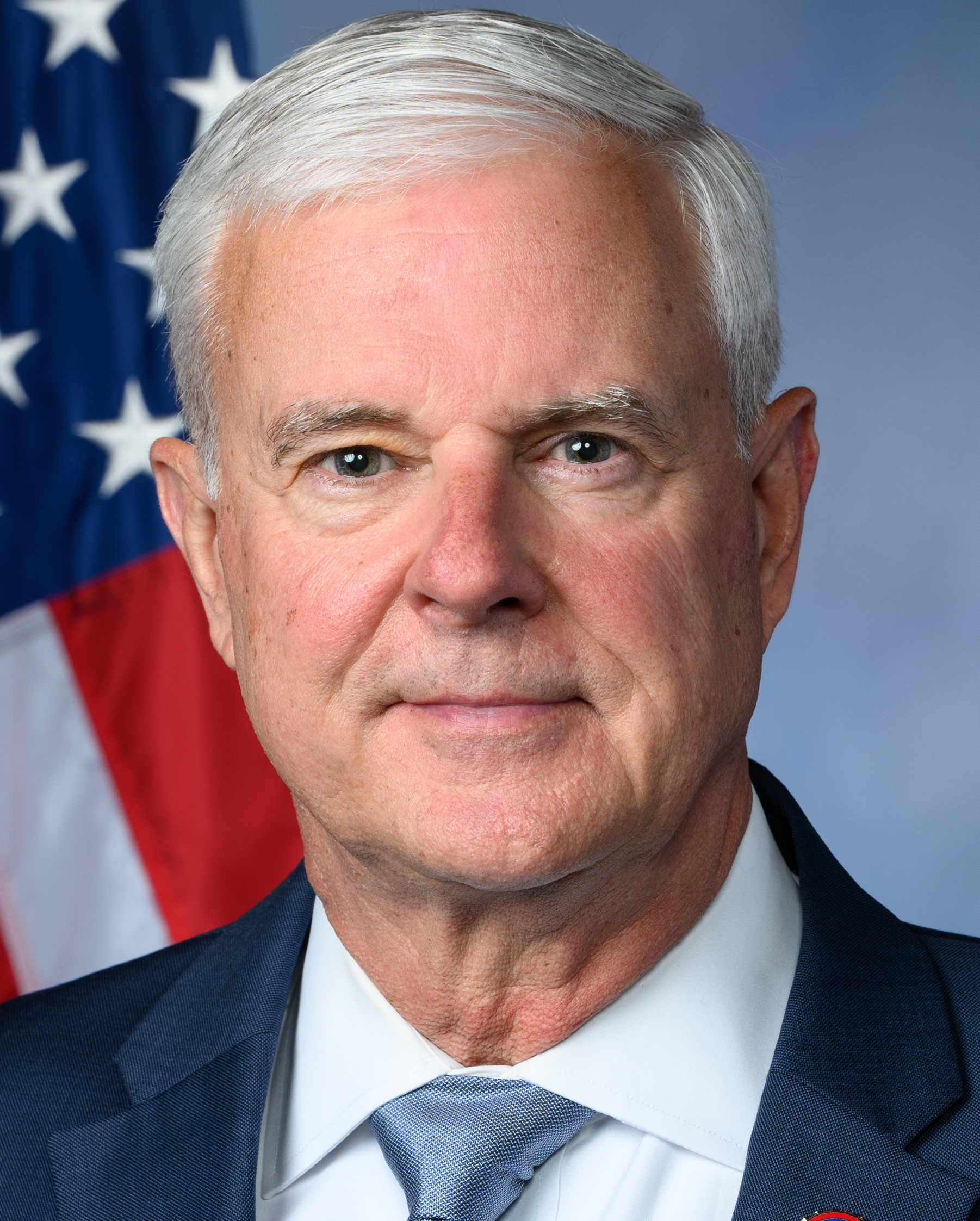

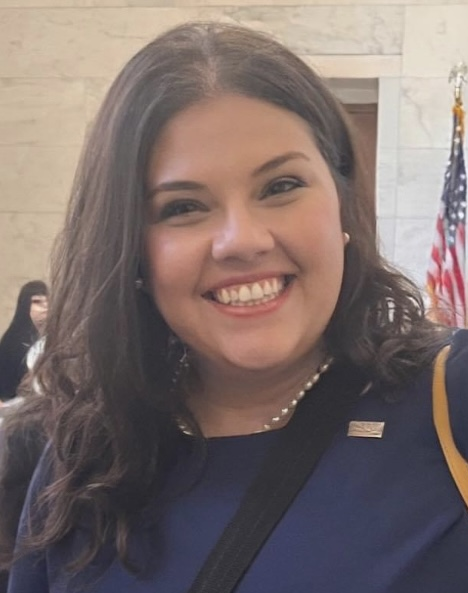
Nominee	Steve Womack	Caitlin Draper
Party	Republican	Democratic
Popular vote	192,101	95,652
Percentage	63.8%	31.8%
- County results Womack: 50–60% 60–70% 70–80%
U.S. Representative before election
Steve Womack
Republican
Elected U.S. Representative
Steve Womack
Republican

The incumbent was Republican Steve Womack, who was re-elected with 63.7% of the vote in 2022.

=== Republican primary ===
==== Candidates ====
===== Nominee =====
- Steve Womack, incumbent U.S. representative

===== Eliminated in primary =====
- Clint Penzo, state senator from the 31st district (2023–present)

==== Endorsements ====
Steve Womack

Federal officials

- John Boozman, U.S. senator from Arkansas (2011–present)
- Tom Cotton, U.S. senator from Arkansas (2015–present)
- Rick Crawford, U.S. representative from Arkansas's 1st congressional district (2011–present)

Statewide officials

- Sarah Huckabee Sanders, governor of Arkansas (2023–present)

Organizations

- AIPAC
- BIPAC
- National Rifle Association Political Victory Fund
- National Right to Life Committee (post-primary)
- Pro-Israel America (post-primary)
- With Honor Fund

==== Fundraising ====
Campaign finance reports as of February 14, 2024
Candidate	Raised	Spent	Cash on hand
Clint Penzo (R)	$93,847	$28,014	$65,832
Steve Womack (R)	$1,284,275	$1,242,540	$1,986,050
Source: Federal Election Commission

=== Results ===
Primary results by county: Womack—50–60%

Republican primary results
Party	Candidate	Votes	%
Republican	Steve Womack (incumbent)	35,768	53.9
Republican	Clint Penzo	30,545	46.1
Total votes		66,313	100.0

=== Democratic primary ===
==== Candidates ====
===== Nominee =====
- Caitlin Draper, psychotherapist

==== Endorsements ====
Caitlin Draper

Organizations

- Vote Common Good

Labor unions

- National Education Association

Political parties

- Democratic Party of Arkansas (post-primary)

==== Fundraising ====
Campaign finance reports as of February 14, 2024
Candidate	Raised	Spent	Cash on hand
Caitlin Draper (D)	$44,653	$21,157	$23,496
Source: Federal Election Commission

=== Libertarian Party ===
==== Nominee ====
- Bobby Wilson, business analyst

=== General election ===
==== Predictions ====
Source	Ranking	As of
The Cook Political Report	Solid R	July 28, 2023
Inside Elections	Solid R	July 28, 2023
Sabato's Crystal Ball	Safe R	June 8, 2023
Elections Daily	Safe R	June 8, 2023
CNalysis	Solid R	November 16, 2023
Decision Desk HQ	Solid R	June 1, 2024

==== Results ====
2024 Arkansas's 3rd congressional district election
Party	Candidate	Votes	%
Republican	Steve Womack (incumbent)	192,101	63.8
Democratic	Caitlin Draper	95,652	31.8
Libertarian	Bobby Wilson	13,331	4.4
Total votes		301,084	100.0
Republican hold			

==== By county ====
County	Steve Womack Republican		Caitlin Draper Democratic		Bobby Wilson Libertarian		Margin		Total
County	#	%	#	%	#	%	#	%	Total
Benton	82,731	65.45%	37,908	29.99%	5,770	4.56%	44,823	35.46%	126,409
Carroll	7,407	65.50%	3,404	30.10%	497	4.40%	4,003	35.40%	11,308
Crawford	16,268	78.32%	3,471	16.71%	1,031	4.96%	12,797	61.61%	20,770
Madison	5,761	78.15%	1,257	17.05%	354	4.80%	4,504	61.10%	7,372
Sebastian (part)	27,526	68.27%	10,902	27.04%	1,892	4.69%	16,624	41.23%	40,320
Washington	52,408	55.22%	38,710	40.79%	3,787	3.99%	13,698	14.43%	94,905
Totals	192,101	63.80%	95,652	31.77%	13,331	4.43%	96,449	32.03%	301,084

== District 4 ==
2024 Arkansas's 4th congressional district election
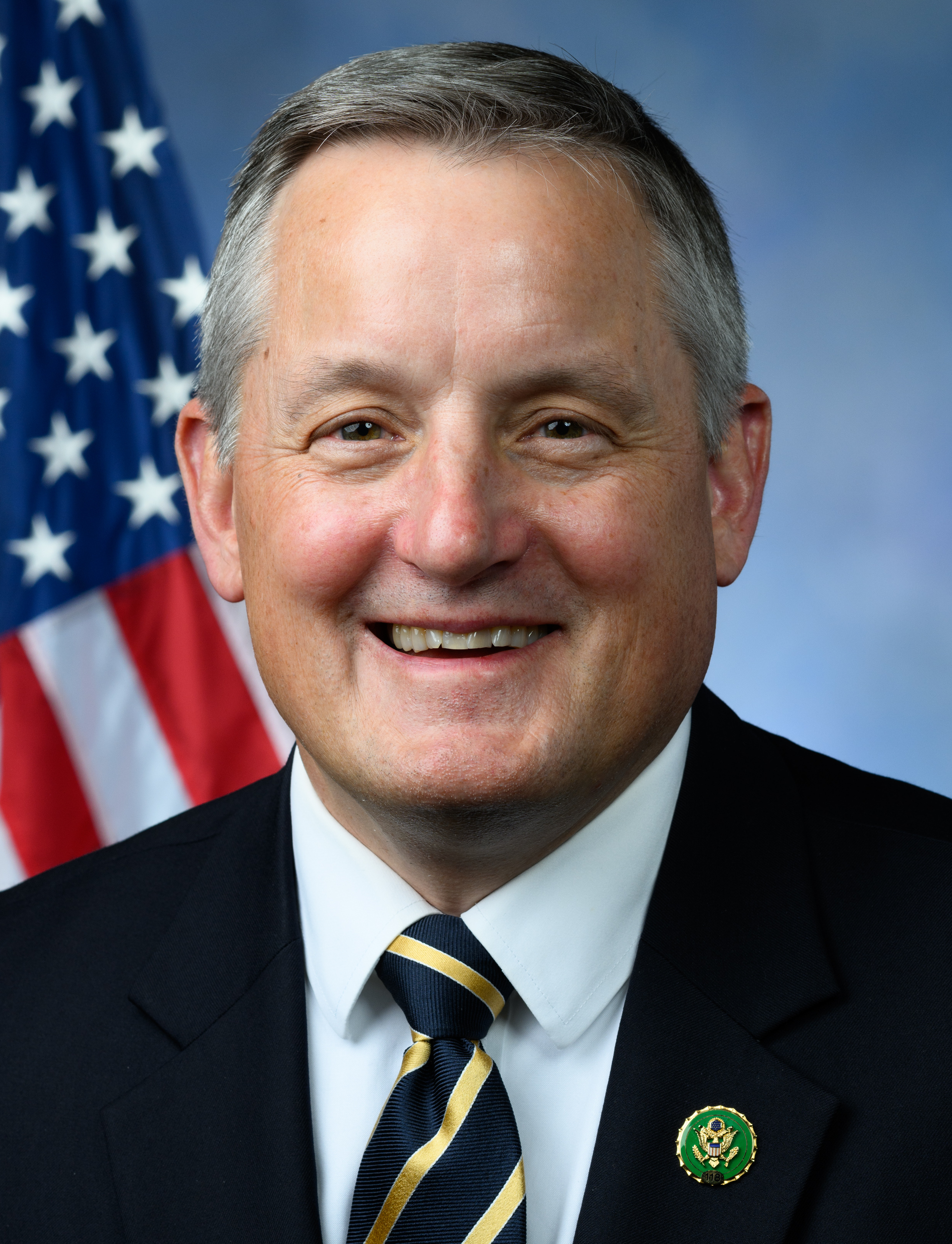

Nominee	Bruce Westerman	Risie Howard
Party	Republican	Democratic
Popular vote	197,046	73,207
Percentage	72.9%	27.1%
- County results Westerman: 60–70% 70–80% 80–90% Howard: 50–60% 70–80%
U.S. Representative before election
Bruce Westerman
Republican
Elected U.S. Representative
Bruce Westerman
Republican

The incumbent was Republican Bruce Westerman, who was re-elected with 71.0% of the vote in 2022.

=== Republican primary ===
==== Candidates ====
===== Nominee =====
- Bruce Westerman, incumbent U.S. representative

==== Endorsements ====
Bruce Westerman

Organizations

- AIPAC
- National Rifle Association Political Victory Fund
- National Right to Life Committee

==== Fundraising ====
Campaign finance reports as of February 14, 2024
Candidate	Raised	Spent	Cash on hand
Bruce Westerman (R)	$1,492,130	$543,602	$2,424,079
Source: Federal Election Commission

=== Democratic primary ===
==== Candidates ====
===== Nominee =====
- Risie Howard, attorney

==== Endorsements ====
Risie Howard

Labor unions

- National Education Association

Political parties

- Democratic Party of Arkansas (post-primary)

=== Independents ===
==== Did not make ballot ====
- John White, retired U.S. Air Force sergeant and Democratic nominee for this district in 2022

=== General election ===
==== Predictions ====
Source	Ranking	As of
The Cook Political Report	Solid R	July 28, 2023
Inside Elections	Solid R	July 28, 2023
Sabato's Crystal Ball	Safe R	June 8, 2023
Elections Daily	Safe R	June 8, 2023
CNalysis	Solid R	November 16, 2023
Decision Desk HQ	Solid R	June 1, 2024

==== Results ====
2024 Arkansas's 4th congressional district election
Party	Candidate	Votes	%
Republican	Bruce Westerman (incumbent)	197,046	72.9
Democratic	Risie Howard	73,207	27.1
Total votes		270,253	100.0
Republican hold			

==== By county ====
County	Bruce Westerman Republican		Risie Howard Democratic		Margin		Total
County	#	%	#	%	#	%	Total
Ashley	5,168	76.21%	1,613	23.79%	3,555	52.43%	6,781
Bradley	2,263	72.53%	857	27.47%	1,406	45.06%	3,120
Calhoun	1,660	82.22%	359	17.78%	1,301	64.44%	2,019
Clark	4,790	63.97%	2,698	36.03%	2,092	27.94%	7,488
Cleveland	2,787	85.94%	456	14.06%	2,331	71.88%	3,243
Columbia	5,397	71.38%	2,164	28.62%	3,233	42.76%	7,561
Dallas	1,472	66.67%	736	33.33%	736	33.33%	2,208
Drew	4,318	69.43%	1,901	30.57%	2,417	38.86%	6,219
Franklin	5,700	84.01%	1,085	15.99%	4,615	68.02%	6,785
Garland	29,186	72.33%	11,165	27.67%	18,021	44.66%	40,351
Grant	6,848	86.63%	1,057	13.37%	5,791	73.26%	7,905
Hempstead	4,278	72.76%	1,602	27.24%	2,676	45.51%	5,880
Hot Spring	9,372	78.63%	2,547	21.37%	6,825	57.26%	11,919
Howard	3,278	76.23%	1,022	23.77%	2,256	52.47%	4,300
Jefferson	9,162	44.06%	11,632	55.94%	-2,470	-11.88%	20,794
Johnson	6,864	78.21%	1,912	21.79%	4,952	56.43%	8,776
Lafayette	1,601	72.54%	606	27.46%	995	45.08%	2,207
Little River	3,759	79.44%	973	20.56%	2,786	58.88%	4,732
Logan	6,703	83.63%	1,312	16.37%	5,391	67.26%	8,015
Miller	11,846	77.42%	3,454	22.58%	8,392	54.85%	15,300
Montgomery	3,007	84.42%	555	15.58%	2,452	68.84%	3,562
Nevada	2,004	71.85%	785	28.15%	1,219	43.71%	2,789
Newton	2,989	83.10%	608	16.90%	2,381	66.19%	3,597
Ouachita	5,233	62.49%	3,141	37.51%	2,092	24.98%	8,374
Pike	3,742	88.03%	509	11.97%	3,233	76.05%	4,251
Polk	7,069	87.68%	993	12.32%	6,076	75.37%	8,062
Pope	18,761	79.14%	4,945	20.86%	13,816	58.28%	23,706
Pulaski (part)	1,869	26.99%	5,055	73.01%	-3,186	-46.01%	6,924
Scott	2,881	88.54%	373	11.46%	2,508	77.07%	3,254
Sebastian (part)	3,667	86.30%	582	13.70%	3,085	72.61%	4,249
Sevier	3,801	82.76%	792	17.24%	3,009	65.51%	4,593
Union	10,398	69.27%	4,613	30.73%	5,785	38.54%	15,011
Yell	5,173	82.40%	1,105	17.60%	4,068	64.80%	6,278
Totals	197,046	72.91%	73,207	27.09%	123,839	45.82%	270,253
