= 2022 United States House of Representatives elections in Arkansas =

- November 8, 2022

All 4 Arkansas seats to the United States House of Representatives
	Majority party	Minority party
Party	Republican	Democratic
Last election	4	0
Seats won	4	0
Seat change	Steady	Steady
Popular vote	598,000	271,771
Percentage	66.81%	30.36%
Swing	▼3.42%	▲2.34%

Republican hold
Republican
50–60%
60–70%
70–80%
80–90%
Democratic
50–60%

The 2022 United States House of Representatives elections in Arkansas were held on November 8, 2022, to elect the four U.S. representatives from the state of Arkansas, one from each of the state's four congressional districts. The elections coincided with the Arkansas gubernatorial election, as well as other elections to the U.S. House of Representatives, elections to the U.S. Senate, and various state and local elections. Primary elections were held on May 24.

== Overview ==
=== District ===
District	Republican		Democratic		Libertarian		Total		Result
District	Votes	%	Votes	%	Votes	%	Votes	%	Result
District 1	153,774	73.80%	54,598	26.20%	0	0.00%	208,372	100.00%	Republican hold
District 2	147,975	60.04%	86,887	35.26%	11,584	4.70%	246,446	100.00%	Republican hold
District 3	142,401	63.69%	73,541	32.89%	7,646	3.42%	223,588	100.00%	Republican hold
District 4	153,850	71.00%	56,745	26.19%	6,101	2.82%	216,696	100.00%	Republican hold
Total	598,000	66.81%	271,771	30.36%	25,331	2.83%	895,102	100.00%	

Popular vote
Republican	66.81%
Democratic	30.36%
Libertarian	2.83%

House seats
Republican	100.00%

=== County ===
County	Republican		Democratic		Libertarian		Margin		Total
County	#	%	#	%	#	%	#	%	Total
Arkansas	3,379	76.36%	1,046	23.64%	0	0.00%	2,333	52.72%	4,425
Ashley	4,076	75.20%	1,243	22.93%	101	1.86%	2,833	52.27%	5,420
Baxter	12,373	80.02%	3,089	19.98%	0	0.00%	9,284	60.04%	15,462
Benton	59,326	65.54%	27,846	30.76%	3,341	3.69%	31,480	34.78%	90,513
Boone	10,433	82.85%	2,160	17.15%	0	0.00%	8,273	65.70%	12,593
Bradley	1,807	70.23%	708	27.52%	58	2.25%	1,099	42.71%	2,573
Calhoun	1,257	79.86%	286	18.17%	31	1.97%	971	61.69%	1,574
Carroll	5,906	65.59%	2,811	31.22%	287	3.19%	3,095	34.37%	9,004
Chicot	1,648	49.58%	1,676	50.42%	0	0.00%	-28	-0.84%	3,324
Clark	3,721	62.20%	2,091	34.95%	170	2.84%	1,630	27.25%	5,982
Clay	3,195	81.55%	723	18.45%	0	0.00%	2,472	63.09%	3,918
Cleburne	6,286	83.00%	1,269	12.71%	428	4.29%	7,017	70.29%	9,983
Cleveland	2,185	83.40%	368	14.05%	67	2.56%	1,817	69.35%	2,620
Columbia	4,184	69.16%	1,735	28.68%	131	2.17%	2,449	40.48%	6,050
Conway	4,563	69.17%	1,767	26.78%	267	4.05%	2,796	42.38%	6,597
Craighead	19,283	70.35%	8,128	29.65%	0	0.00%	11,155	40.70%	27,411
Crawford	13,762	79.47%	2,981	17.21%	575	3.32%	10,781	62.25%	17,318
Crittenden	5,459	51.59%	5,123	48.41%	0	0.00%	336	3.18%	10,582
Cross	3,786	77.41%	1,105	22.59%	0	0.00%	2,681	54.81%	4,891
Dallas	1,354	66.41%	633	31.04%	52	2.55%	721	35.36%	2,039
Desha	1,599	55.83%	1,265	44.17%	0	0.00%	334	11.66%	2,864
Drew	3,498	67.18%	1,566	30.07%	143	2.75%	1,932	37.10%	5,207
Faulkner	26,422	66.34%	11,323	28.43%	2,084	5.23%	15,099	37.91%	39,829
Franklin	4,165	79.88%	892	17.11%	157	3.01%	3,273	62.77%	5,214
Fulton	3,211	81.13%	747	18.87%	0	0.00%	2,464	62.25%	3,958
Garland	23,467	71.13%	8,378	25.39%	1,149	3.48%	15,089	45.73%	32,994
Grant	5,285	84.28%	834	13.30%	152	2.42%	4,451	70.98%	6,271
Greene	9,331	81.34%	2,140	18.66%	0	0.00%	7,191	62.69%	11,471
Hempstead	3,286	73.14%	1,110	24.71%	97	2.16%	2,176	48.43%	4,493
Hot Spring	7,381	76.27%	1,989	20.55%	308	3.18%	5,392	55.71%	9,678
Howard	2,684	74.21%	856	23.67%	77	2.13%	1,828	50.54%	3,617
Independence	8,496	81.55%	1,922	18.45%	0	0.00%	6,574	63.10%	10,418
Izard	3,794	83.55%	747	16.45%	0	0.00%	3,047	67.10%	4,541
Jackson	2,981	74.77%	1,006	25.23%	0	0.00%	1,975	49.54%	3,987
Jefferson	7,309	43.36%	9,108	54.03%	440	2.61%	-1,799	-10.67%	16,857
Johnson	5,273	75.99%	1,424	20.52%	242	3.49%	3,849	55.47%	6,939
Lafayette	1,318	67.56%	592	30.34%	41	2.10%	726	37.21%	1,951
Lawrence	3,754	82.40%	802	17.60%	0	0.00%	2,952	64.79%	4,556
Lee	970	50.31%	958	49.69%	0	0.00%	12	0.62%	1,928
Lincoln	2,042	76.25%	636	23.75%	0	0.00%	1,406	52.50%	2,678
Little River	2,886	76.59%	777	20.62%	105	2.79%	2,109	55.97%	3,768
Logan	4,996	80.68%	997	16.10%	199	3.21%	3,999	64.58%	6,192
Lonoke	17,482	78.93%	4,666	21.07%	0	0.00%	12,816	57.87%	22,148
Madison	4,408	78.06%	1,056	18.70%	183	3.24%	3,352	59.36%	5,647
Marion	4,844	81.92%	1,069	18.08%	0	0.00%	3,775	63.84%	5,913
Miller	8,588	76.75%	2,354	21.04%	248	2.22%	6,234	55.71%	11,190
Mississippi	5,207	60.91%	3,341	39.09%	0	0.00%	1,866	21.83%	8,548
Monroe	1,223	58.83%	856	41.17%	0	0.00%	367	17.65%	2,079
Montgomery	2,551	81.66%	492	15.75%	81	2.59%	2,059	65.91%	3,124
Nevada	1,685	68.97%	714	29.23%	44	1.80%	971	39.75%	2,443
Newton	2,462	81.01%	489	16.09%	88	2.90%	1,973	64.92%	3,039
Ouachita	4,185	60.32%	2,583	37.23%	170	2.45%	1,602	23.09%	6,938
Perry	2,927	77.47%	665	17.60%	186	4.92%	2,262	59.87%	3,778
Phillips	1,929	46.45%	2,224	53.55%	0	0.00%	-295	-7.10%	4,153
Pike	3,151	85.32%	450	12.19%	92	2.49%	2,701	73.14%	3,693
Poinsett	4,526	81.95%	997	18.05%	0	0.00%	3,529	63.90%	5,523
Polk	5,737	83.73%	874	12.76%	241	3.52%	4,863	70.97%	6,852
Pope	13,004	76.63%	3,415	20.12%	551	3.25%	9,589	56.51%	16,970
Prairie	2,183	84.71%	394	15.29%	0	0.00%	1,789	69.42%	2,577
Pulaski	54,469	44.39%	63,297	51.58%	4,948	4.03%	-8,828	-7.19%	122,714
Randolph	4,328	83.06%	883	16.94%	0	0.00%	3,445	66.11%	5,211
Saline	30,908	71.93%	9,750	22.69%	2,309	5.37%	21,158	49.24%	42,967
Scott	2,494	85.56%	333	11.42%	88	3.02%	2,161	74.13%	2,915
Searcy	2,556	86.26%	407	13.74%	0	0.00%	2,149	72.53%	2,963
Sebastian	24,184	70.78%	8,820	25.81%	1,164	3.41%	15,364	44.97%	34,168
Sevier	2,902	82.09%	529	14.96%	104	2.94%	2,373	67.13%	3,535
Sharp	4,995	83.08%	1,017	16.92%	0	0.00%	3,978	66.17%	6,012
St. Francis	2,573	51.60%	2,413	48.40%	0	0.00%	160	3.21%	4,986
Stone	4,015	80.14%	995	19.86%	0	0.00%	3,020	60.28%	5,010
Union	8,004	69.30%	3,301	28.58%	245	2.12%	4,703	40.72%	11,550
Van Buren	4,778	77.03%	1,043	16.81%	382	6.16%	3,735	60.21%	6,203
Washington	37,619	53.52%	30,485	43.37%	2,189	3.11%	7,134	10.15%	70,293
White	18,243	79.44%	3,553	15.47%	1,168	5.09%	14,690	63.97%	22,964
Woodruff	1,397	67.95%	659	32.05%	0	0.00%	738	35.89%	2,056
Yell	4,312	82.13%	790	15.05%	148	2.82%	3,522	67.09%	5,250
Totals	598,000	66.81%	271,771	30.36%	25,331	2.83%	326,229	36.45%	895,102

== District 1 ==
2022 Arkansas's 1st congressional district election
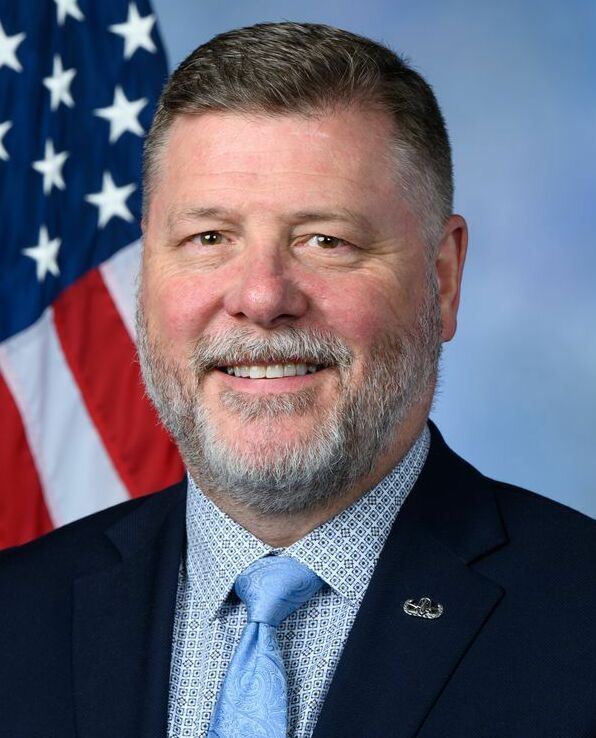

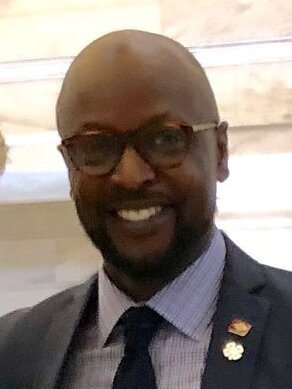
Nominee	Rick Crawford	Monte Hodges
Party	Republican	Democratic
Popular vote	153,774	54,598
Percentage	73.8%	26.2%
- County results Crawford: 50–60% 60–70% 70–80% 80–90% Hodges: 50–60% 60–70%
U.S. Representative before election
Rick Crawford
Republican
Elected U.S. Representative
Rick Crawford
Republican

The incumbent was Republican Rick Crawford, who was re-elected unopposed in 2020. The new 1st district covers the Northeast corner of the state — very similar to its predecessor — but now comprises a greater portion of the state's Northern border.

=== Republican primary ===
==== Candidates ====
===== Nominee =====
- Rick Crawford, incumbent U.S. representative

===== Eliminated in primary =====
- Jody Shackelford, attorney
- Brandt Smith, state representative

==== Endorsements ====
Rick Crawford

U.S. Executive Branch officials

- Donald Trump, 45th president of the United States (2017–2021)

Organizations

- National Rifle Association-Political Victory Fund

==== Results ====
Results by county Crawford: 60–70%; 70–80%; 80–90%

Republican primary results
Party	Candidate	Votes	%
Republican	Rick Crawford (incumbent)	64,102	74.6
Republican	Brandt Smith	11,981	13.9
Republican	Jody Shackelford	9,837	11.5
Total votes		85,920	100.0

=== Democratic primary ===
==== Candidates ====
===== Nominee =====
- Monte Hodges, state representative

=== General election ===
==== Debate ====
2022 Arkansas's 1st congressional district debate
No.	Date	Host	Moderator	Link	Republican	Democratic
Key: P Participant A Absent N Not invited I Invited W Withdrawn						
Key: P Participant A Absent N Not invited I Invited W Withdrawn					Rick Crawford	Monte Hodges
1	Oct. 20, 2022	Arkansas PBS	Steve Barnes	YouTube	P	P

==== Predictions ====
Source	Ranking	As of
The Cook Political Report	Solid R	November 2, 2021
Inside Elections	Solid R	March 16, 2022
Sabato's Crystal Ball	Safe R	October 14, 2021
Politico	Solid R	April 5, 2022
RCP	Safe R	June 9, 2022
Fox News	Solid R	July 11, 2022
DDHQ	Solid R	July 20, 2022
538	Solid R	June 30, 2022
The Economist	Safe R	September 7, 2022

==== Results ====
2022 Arkansas's 1st congressional district election
Party	Candidate	Votes	%
Republican	Rick Crawford (incumbent)	153,774	73.8
Democratic	Monte Hodges	54,598	26.2
Total votes		208,372	100.0
Republican hold			

==== By county ====
County	Rick Crawford Republican		Monte Hodges Democratic		Margin		Total
County	#	%	#	%	#	%	Total
Arkansas	3,379	76.36%	1,046	23.64%	2,333	52.72%	4,425
Baxter	12,373	80.02%	3,089	19.98%	9,284	60.04%	15,462
Boone	10,433	82.85%	2,160	17.15%	8,273	65.70%	12,593
Chicot	1,648	49.58%	1,676	50.42%	-28	-0.84%	3,324
Clay	3,195	81.55%	723	18.45%	2,472	63.09%	3,918
Craighead	19,283	70.35%	8,128	29.65%	11,155	40.70%	27,411
Crittenden	5,459	51.59%	5,123	48.41%	336	3.18%	10,582
Cross	3,786	77.41%	1,105	22.59%	2,681	54.81%	4,891
Desha	1,599	55.83%	1,265	44.17%	334	11.66%	2,864
Fulton	3,211	81.13%	747	18.87%	2,464	62.25%	3,958
Greene	9,331	81.34%	2,140	18.66%	7,191	62.69%	11,471
Independence	8,496	81.55%	1,922	18.45%	6,574	63.10%	10,418
Izard	3,794	83.55%	747	16.45%	3,047	67.10%	4,541
Jackson	2,981	74.77%	1,006	25.23%	1,975	49.54%	3,987
Lawrence	3,754	82.40%	802	17.60%	2,952	64.79%	4,556
Lee	970	50.31%	958	49.69%	12	0.62%	1,928
Lincoln	2,042	76.25%	636	23.75%	1,406	52.50%	2,678
Lonoke	17,482	78.93%	4,666	21.07%	12,816	57.87%	22,148
Marion	4,844	81.92%	1,069	18.08%	3,775	63.84%	5,913
Mississippi	5,207	60.91%	3,341	39.09%	1,866	21.83%	8,548
Monroe	1,223	58.83%	856	41.17%	367	17.65%	2,079
Phillips	1,929	46.45%	2,224	53.55%	-295	-7.10%	4,153
Poinsett	4,526	81.95%	997	18.05%	3,529	63.90%	5,523
Prairie	2,183	84.71%	394	15.29%	1,789	69.42%	2,577
Pulaski (part)	782	35.77%	1,404	64.23%	-622	-28.45%	2,186
Randolph	4,328	83.06%	883	16.94%	3,445	66.11%	5,211
Searcy	2,556	86.26%	407	13.74%	2,149	72.53%	2,963
Sharp	4,995	83.08%	1,017	16.92%	3,978	66.17%	6,012
St. Francis	2,573	51.60%	2,413	48.40%	160	3.21%	4,986
Stone	4,015	80.14%	995	19.86%	3,020	60.28%	5,010
Woodruff	1,397	67.95%	659	32.05%	738	35.89%	2,056
Totals	153,774	73.80%	54,598	26.20%	99,176	47.60%	208,372

== District 2 ==
2022 Arkansas's 2nd congressional district election
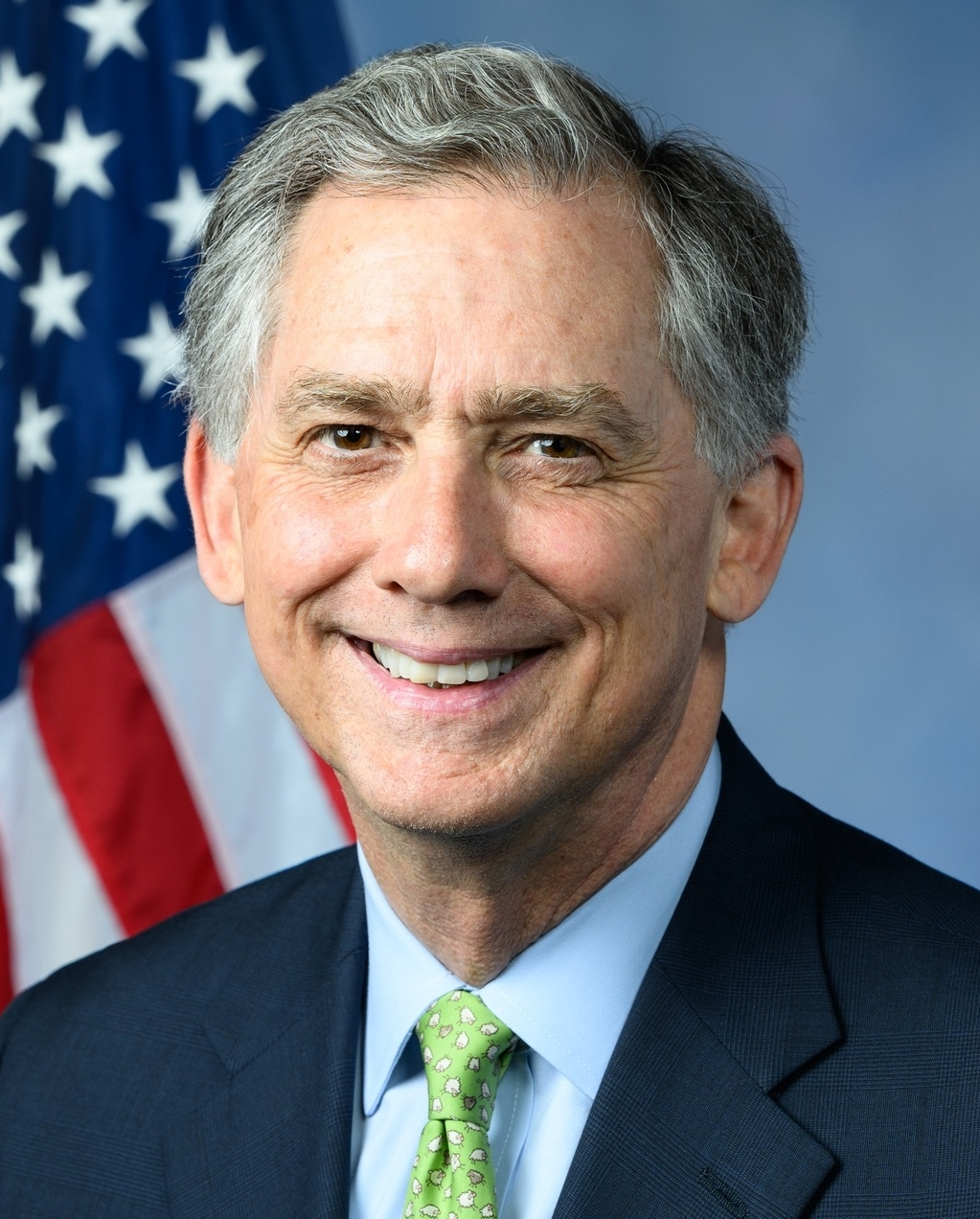

Nominee	French Hill	Quintessa Hathaway
Party	Republican	Democratic
Popular vote	147,975	86,887
Percentage	60.0%	35.3%
- County results Hill: 60–70% 70–80% 80–90% Hathaway: 50–60%
U.S. Representative before election
French Hill
Republican
Elected U.S. Representative
French Hill
Republican

The incumbent was Republican French Hill, who was re-elected with 55.4% of the vote in 2020. The 2nd district has been the most competitive district in recent years, but redistricting — including dividing Little Rock — makes the district less competitive going forward. The 2nd district still comprises the central part of Arkansas.

=== Republican primary ===
==== Candidates ====
===== Nominee =====
- French Hill, incumbent U.S. representative

===== Eliminated in primary =====
- Conrad Reynolds, veteran

==== Endorsements ====
French Hill

Organizations

- National Rifle Association-Political Victory Fund
- Pro-Israel America
Conrad Reynolds

U.S. Executive Branch officials

- Michael Flynn, former United States National Security Advisor (2017)

==== Results ====
Results by county: Hill: 50–60%; 60–70%; Reynolds: 50–60%

Republican primary results
Party	Candidate	Votes	%
Republican	French Hill (incumbent)	49,488	58.5
Republican	Conrad Reynolds	35,078	41.5
Total votes		84,566	100.0

=== Democratic primary ===
==== Candidates ====
===== Nominee =====
- Quintessa Hathaway, educator and public advocate

===== Withdrawn =====
- Nick Cartwright, former Rose Bud city council member (running for State Senate)

=== Libertarian convention ===
==== Candidates ====
===== Nominee =====
- Michael White

=== General election ===
==== Debate ====
2022 Arkansas's 2nd congressional district debate
No.	Date	Host	Moderator	Link	Republican	Democratic	Libertarian
Key: P Participant A Absent N Not invited I Invited W Withdrawn							
Key: P Participant A Absent N Not invited I Invited W Withdrawn					French Hill	Quintessa Hathaway	Michael White
1	Oct. 20, 2022	Arkansas PBS	Steve Barnes	YouTube	P	P	P

==== Predictions ====
Source	Ranking	As of
The Cook Political Report	Solid R	November 2, 2021
Inside Elections	Solid R	March 16, 2022
Sabato's Crystal Ball	Safe R	October 14, 2021
Politico	Solid R	April 5, 2022
RCP	Safe R	June 9, 2022
Fox News	Solid R	July 11, 2022
DDHQ	Solid R	July 20, 2022
538	Solid R	June 30, 2022
The Economist	Safe R	September 7, 2022

==== Results ====
2022 Arkansas's 2nd congressional district election
Party	Candidate	Votes	%
Republican	French Hill (incumbent)	147,975	60.0
Democratic	Quintessa Hathaway	86,887	35.3
Libertarian	Michael White	11,584	4.7
Total votes		246,446	100.0
Republican hold			

==== By county ====
County	French Hill Republican		Quintessa Hathaway Democratic		Michael White Libertarian		Margin		Total
County	#	%	#	%	#	%	#	%	Total
Cleburne	8,286	83.00%	1,269	12.71%	428	4.29%	7,017	70.29%	9,983
Conway	4,563	69.17%	1,767	26.78%	267	4.05%	2,796	42.38%	6,597
Faulkner	26,422	66.34%	11,323	28.43%	2,084	5.23%	15,099	37.91%	39,829
Perry	2,927	77.47%	665	17.60%	186	4.92%	2,262	59.87%	3,778
Pulaski (part)	51,848	45.43%	57,517	50.40%	4,760	4.17%	-5,669	-4.97%	114,125
Saline	30,908	71.93%	9,750	22.69%	2,309	5.37%	21,158	49.24%	42,967
Van Buren	4,778	77.03%	1,043	16.81%	382	6.16%	3,735	60.21%	6,203
White	18,243	79.44%	3,553	15.47%	1,168	5.09%	14,690	63.97%	22,964
Totals	147,975	60.04%	86,887	35.26%	11,584	4.70%	61,088	24.79%	246,446

== District 3 ==
2022 Arkansas's 3rd congressional district election
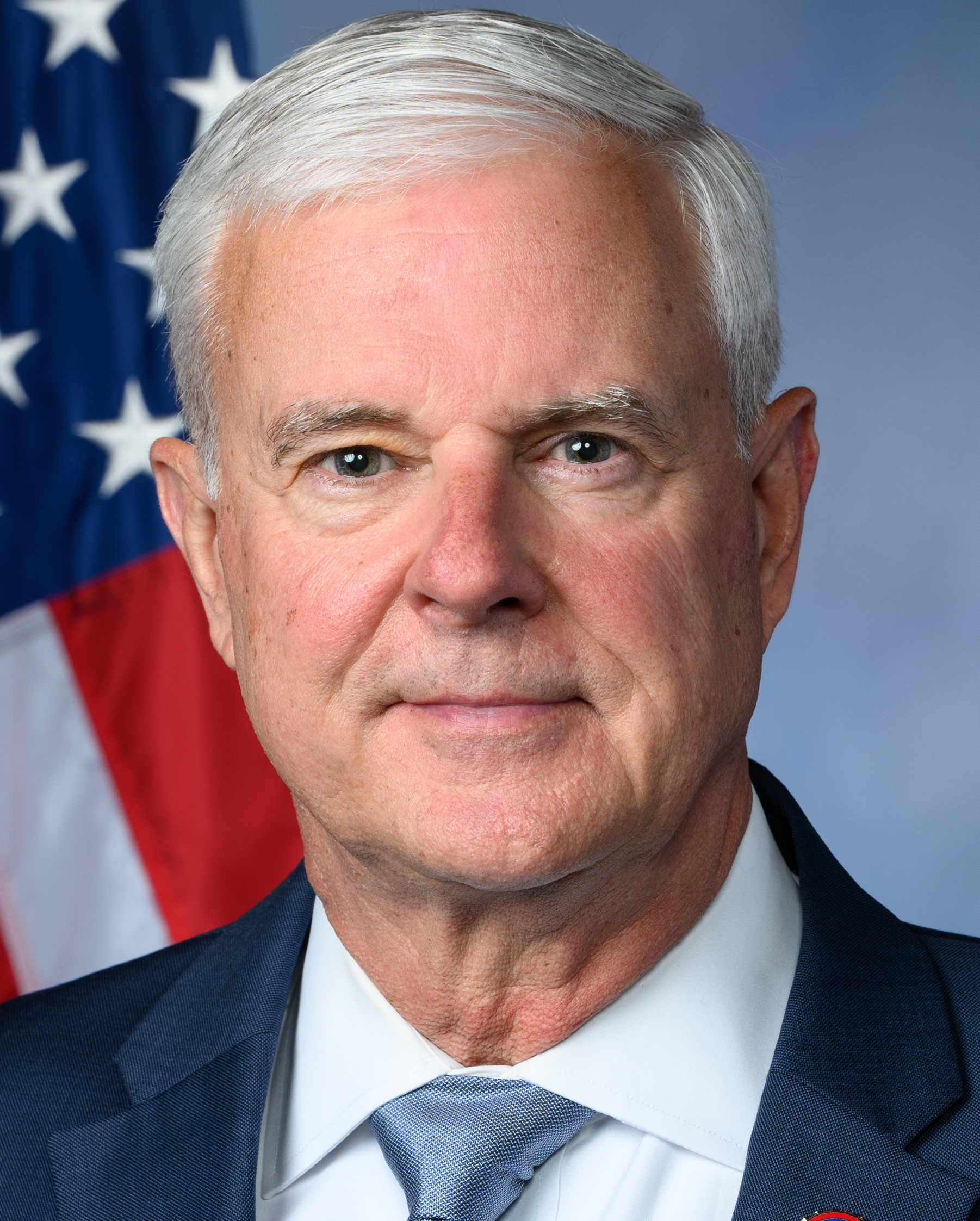

Nominee	Steve Womack	Lauren Mallett-Hays
Party	Republican	Democratic
Popular vote	142,401	73,541
Percentage	63.7%	32.9%
- County results Womack: 50–60% 60–70% 70–80%
U.S. Representative before election
Steve Womack
Republican
Elected U.S. Representative
Steve Womack
Republican

The incumbent was Republican Steve Womack, who was re-elected with 64.3% of the vote in 2020. The new 3rd district is slightly more competitive than its predecessor, but it is more compact too; the district now comprises only the Northwest corner of the state.

=== Republican primary ===
==== Candidates ====
===== Nominee =====
- Steve Womack, incumbent U.S. representative

===== Eliminated in primary =====
- Neil Robinson Kumar, law student

==== Endorsements ====
Steve Womack

Organizations

- National Rifle Association-Political Victory Fund

==== Results ====
Results by county Womack: 70–80%; 80–90%

Republican primary results
Party	Candidate	Votes	%
Republican	Steve Womack (incumbent)	60,814	78.7
Republican	Neil Robinson Kumar	16,414	21.3
Total votes		77,228	100.0

=== Democratic primary ===
==== Candidates ====
===== Nominee =====
- Lauren Mallett-Hays, speech-language pathologist

=== Libertarian convention ===
==== Candidates ====
===== Nominee =====
- Michael Kalagias, candidate for this seat in 2018 and 2020

=== General election ===
==== Debate ====
2022 Arkansas's 3rd congressional district debate
No.	Date	Host	Moderator	Link	Republican	Democratic	Libertarian
Key: P Participant A Absent N Not invited I Invited W Withdrawn							
Key: P Participant A Absent N Not invited I Invited W Withdrawn					Steve Womack	Lauren Mallett-Hays	Michael Kalagias
1	Oct. 17, 2022	Arkansas PBS	Steve Barnes	YouTube	P	P	P

==== Predictions ====
Source	Ranking	As of
The Cook Political Report	Solid R	November 2, 2021
Inside Elections	Solid R	March 16, 2022
Sabato's Crystal Ball	Safe R	October 14, 2021
Politico	Solid R	April 5, 2022
RCP	Safe R	June 9, 2022
Fox News	Solid R	July 11, 2022
DDHQ	Solid R	July 20, 2022
538	Solid R	June 30, 2022
The Economist	Safe R	September 7, 2022

==== Results ====
2022 Arkansas's 3rd congressional district election
Party	Candidate	Votes	%
Republican	Steve Womack (incumbent)	142,401	63.7
Democratic	Lauren Mallett-Hays	73,541	32.9
Libertarian	Michael Kalagias	7,646	3.4
Total votes		223,588	100.0
Republican hold			

==== By county ====
County	Steve Womack Republican		Lauren Mallett-Hayes Democratic		Michael Kalagias Libertarian		Margin		Total
County	#	%	#	%	#	%	#	%	Total
Benton	59,326	65.54%	27,846	30.76%	3,341	3.69%	31,480	34.78%	90,513
Carroll	5,906	65.59%	2,811	31.22%	287	3.19%	3,095	34.37%	9,004
Crawford	13,762	79.47%	2,981	17.21%	575	3.32%	10,781	62.25%	17,318
Madison	4,408	78.06%	1,056	18.70%	183	3.24%	3,352	59.36%	5,647
Sebastian (part)	21,380	69.39%	8,362	27.14%	1,071	3.48%	13,018	42.25%	30,813
Washington	37,619	53.52%	30,485	43.37%	2,189	3.11%	7,134	10.15%	70,293
Totals	142,401	63.69%	73,541	32.89%	7,646	3.42%	68,860	30.80%	223,588

== District 4 ==
2022 Arkansas's 4th congressional district election
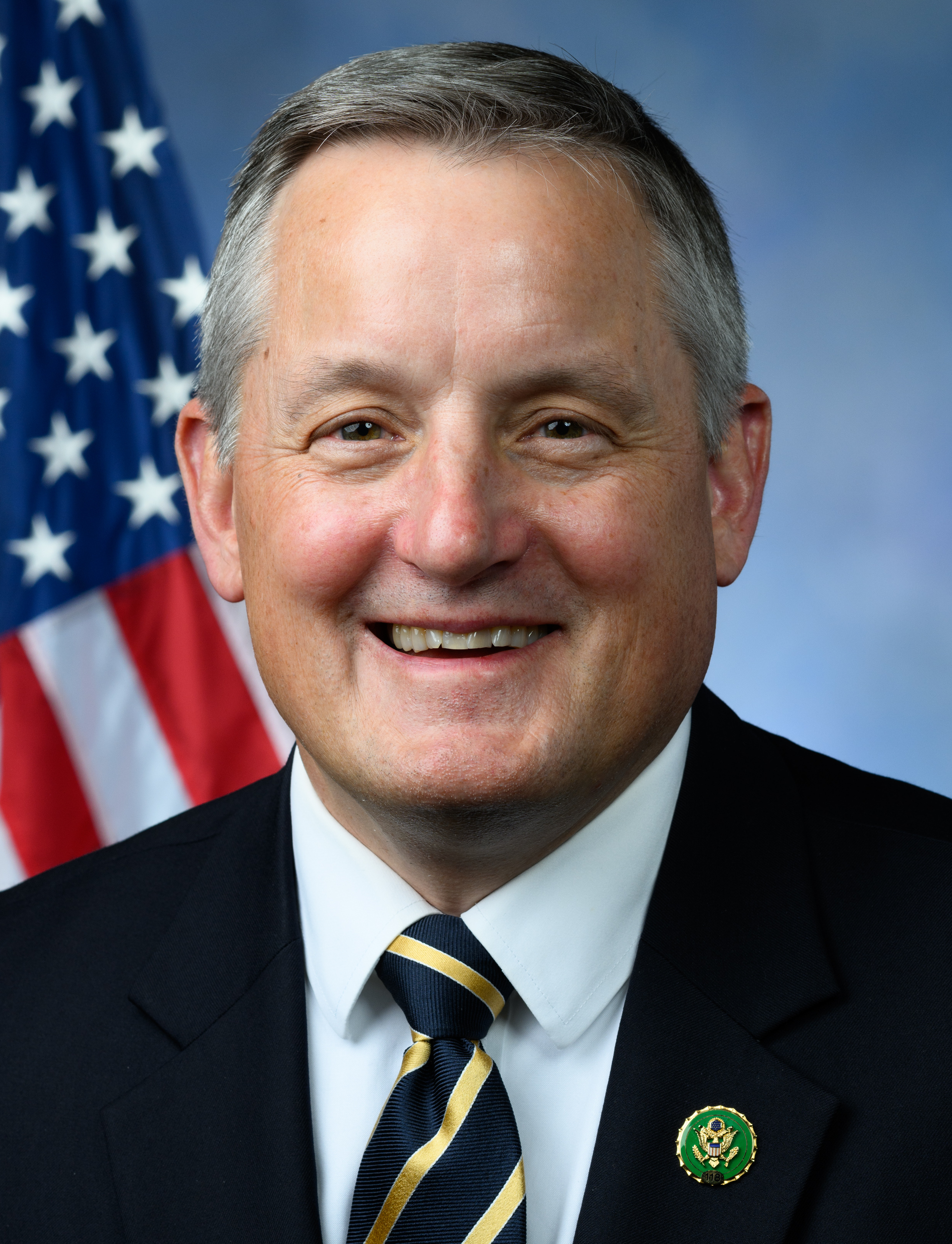

Nominee	Bruce Westerman	John White
Party	Republican	Democratic
Popular vote	153,850	56,745
Percentage	71.0%	26.2%
- County results Westerman: 60–70% 70–80% 80–90% White: 50–60% 60–70%
U.S. Representative before election
Bruce Westerman
Republican
Elected U.S. Representative
Bruce Westerman
Republican

The incumbent was Republican Bruce Westerman, who was re-elected with 69.7% of the vote in 2020. The new 4th district still comprises the majority of the Southern part of the state, and it is now slightly more competitive. Democratic nominee John White attracted attention when, unusually for a member of his party, he denied the legitimacy of President Joe Biden and the 2020 United States presidential election during a debate. White also claimed that "the American people have not legitimately elected a president since Kennedy." After the debate, the Arkansas Democratic Party released a statement denouncing White and his claims of election fraud.

=== Republican primary ===
==== Candidates ====
===== Nominee =====
- Bruce Westerman, incumbent U.S. representative

==== Endorsements ====
Bruce Westerman

Organizations

- Citizens for Responsible Energy Solutions

=== Democratic primary ===
==== Candidates ====
===== Nominee =====
- John White

=== Libertarian convention ===
==== Candidates ====
===== Nominee =====
- Gregory Maxwell

=== Debate ===
2022 Arkansas's 4th congressional district debate
No.	Date	Host	Moderator	Link	Republican	Democratic	Libertarian
Key: P Participant A Absent N Not invited I Invited W Withdrawn							
Key: P Participant A Absent N Not invited I Invited W Withdrawn					Bruce Westerman	John White	Gregory Maxwell
1	Oct. 17, 2022	Arkansas PBS	Steve Barnes	YouTube	P	P	P

==== Predictions ====
Source	Ranking	As of
The Cook Political Report	Solid R	November 2, 2021
Inside Elections	Solid R	March 16, 2022
Sabato's Crystal Ball	Safe R	October 14, 2021
Politico	Solid R	April 5, 2022
RCP	Safe R	June 9, 2022
Fox News	Solid R	July 11, 2022
DDHQ	Solid R	July 20, 2022
538	Solid R	June 30, 2022
The Economist	Safe R	September 7, 2022

==== Results ====
2022 Arkansas's 4th congressional district election
Party	Candidate	Votes	%
Republican	Bruce Westerman (incumbent)	153,850	71.0
Democratic	John White	56,745	26.2
Libertarian	Gregory Maxwell	6,101	2.8
Total votes		216,696	100.0
Republican hold			

==== By county ====
County	Bruce Westerman Republican		John White Democratic		Gregory Maxwell Libertarian		Margin		Total
County	#	%	#	%	#	%	#	%	Total
Ashley	4,076	75.20%	1,243	22.93%	101	1.86%	2,833	52.27%	5,420
Bradley	1,807	70.23%	708	27.52%	58	2.25%	1,099	42.71%	2,573
Calhoun	1,257	79.86%	286	18.17%	31	1.97%	971	61.69%	1,574
Clark	3,721	62.20%	2,091	34.95%	170	2.84%	1,630	27.25%	5,982
Cleveland	2,185	83.40%	368	14.05%	67	2.56%	1,817	69.35%	2,620
Columbia	4,184	69.16%	1,735	28.68%	131	2.17%	2,449	40.48%	6,050
Dallas	1,354	66.41%	633	31.04%	52	2.55%	721	35.36%	2,039
Drew	3,498	67.18%	1,566	30.07%	143	2.75%	1,932	37.10%	5,207
Franklin	4,165	79.88%	892	17.11%	157	3.01%	3,273	62.77%	5,214
Garland	23,467	71.13%	8,378	25.39%	1,149	3.48%	15,089	45.73%	32,994
Grant	5,285	84.28%	834	13.30%	152	2.42%	4,451	70.98%	6,271
Hempstead	3,286	73.14%	1,110	24.71%	97	2.16%	2,176	48.43%	4,493
Hot Spring	7,381	76.27%	1,989	20.55%	308	3.18%	5,392	55.71%	9,678
Howard	2,684	74.21%	856	23.67%	77	2.13%	1,828	50.54%	3,617
Jefferson	7,309	43.36%	9,108	54.03%	440	2.61%	-1,799	-10.67%	16,857
Johnson	5,273	75.99%	1,424	20.52%	242	3.49%	3,849	55.47%	6,939
Lafayette	1,318	67.56%	592	30.34%	41	2.10%	726	37.21%	1,951
Little River	2,886	76.59%	777	20.62%	105	2.79%	2,109	55.97%	3,768
Logan	4,996	80.68%	997	16.10%	199	3.21%	3,999	64.58%	6,192
Miller	8,588	76.75%	2,354	21.04%	248	2.22%	6,234	55.71%	11,190
Montgomery	2,551	81.66%	492	15.75%	81	2.59%	2,059	65.91%	3,124
Nevada	1,685	68.97%	714	29.23%	44	1.80%	971	39.75%	2,443
Newton	2,462	81.01%	489	16.09%	88	2.90%	1,973	64.92%	3,039
Ouachita	4,185	60.32%	2,583	37.23%	170	2.45%	1,602	23.09%	6,938
Pike	3,151	85.32%	450	12.19%	92	2.49%	2,701	73.14%	3,693
Polk	5,737	83.73%	874	12.76%	241	3.52%	4,863	70.97%	6,852
Pope	13,004	76.63%	3,415	20.12%	551	3.25%	9,589	56.51%	16,970
Pulaski (part)	1,839	28.72%	4,376	68.34%	188	2.94%	-2,537	-39.62%	6,403
Scott	2,494	85.56%	333	11.42%	88	3.02%	2,161	74.13%	2,915
Sebastian (part)	2,804	83.58%	458	13.65%	93	2.77%	2,346	69.93%	3,355
Sevier	2,902	82.09%	529	14.96%	104	2.94%	2,373	67.13%	3,535
Union	8,004	69.30%	3,301	28.58%	245	2.12%	4,703	40.72%	11,550
Yell	4,312	82.13%	790	15.05%	148	2.82%	3,522	67.09%	5,250
Totals	153,850	71.00%	56,745	26.19%	6,101	2.82%	97,105	44.81%	216,696
