= Steve Womack =

American politician (born 1957)

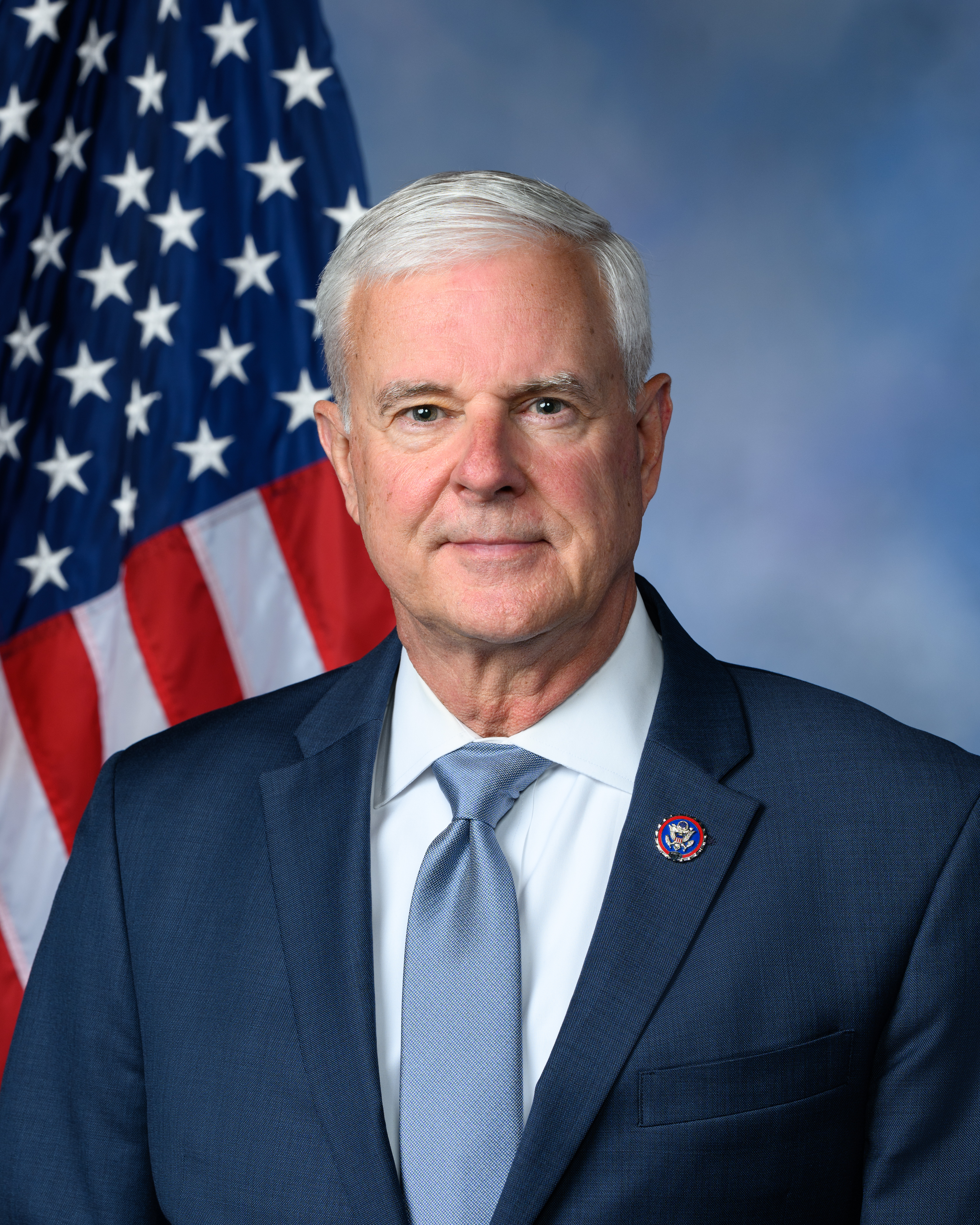
- Official portrait, 2023

Ranking Member of the House Budget Committee
- In office January 3, 2019 – January 3, 2021
- Preceded by: John Yarmuth
- Succeeded by: Jason Smith

Chair of the House Budget Committee
- In office January 11, 2018 – January 3, 2019
- Preceded by: Diane Black
- Succeeded by: John Yarmuth

Member of the U.S. House of Representatives from Arkansas's 3rd district
- Incumbent
- Assumed office January 3, 2011
- Preceded by: John Boozman

Mayor of Rogers
- In office January 1, 1999 – January 3, 2011
- Preceded by: John Sampier
- Succeeded by: Greg Hines

Personal details
- Born: Stephen Allen Womack; February 18, 1957 (age 69) Russellville, Arkansas, U.S.
- Party: Republican
- Spouse: Terri Lynn Williams (m. 1984; died 2026)
- Children: 3
- Education: Arkansas Tech University (BA)
- Website: House website Campaign website

Military service
- Branch/service: United States Army
- Years of service: 1979–2009
- Rank: Colonel
- Unit: Arkansas Army National Guard
- Awards: Legion of Merit; Meritorious Service Medal; Army Commendation Medal
- Steve Womack's voice Steve Womack opening a House Budget Committee hearing on the FY2019 federal budget. Recorded February 14, 2018

Stephen Allen Womack (/ˈwoʊmæk/ WOH-mack; born February 18, 1957) is an American politician serving as the U.S. representative for Arkansas's 3rd congressional district since 2011. The district covers much of northwestern Arkansas, including Fort Smith, Fayetteville, Springdale, and Womack's hometown of Rogers. Before he was elected to Congress, Womack was mayor of Rogers. He is a member of the Republican Party.

A moderate Republican, Womack is a member of the Republican Governance Group. He chaired the House Budget Committee from 2018 to 2019, and was its ranking member from 2019 to 2021.

== Early life, education and career before politics ==
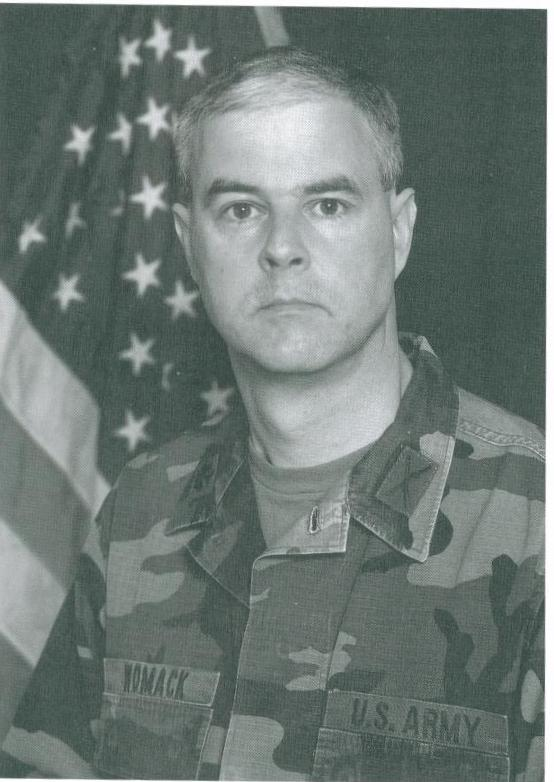
Steve Womack as an Army National Guard lieutenant colonel in 2002

Womack was born in Russellville, Arkansas. His parents were Elisabeth (née Canerday) and James Kermit Womack. Womack graduated from Russellville High School in 1975.

He graduated with a Bachelor of Arts in communications from Arkansas Tech University in 1979. That same year, his father founded KURM (AM). Womack served as station manager. Also in 1979, he enlisted in the Arkansas Army National Guard.

He left the radio station in 1990 and became executive officer for the Arkansas Reserve Officers' Training Corps at the University of Arkansas in Fayetteville. He left that role in 1996. He then became a financial consultant for Merrill Lynch, while still serving in the national guard. He retired from the national guard in 2009 as a colonel.

== Entry into politics ==
In 1998, Womack was elected mayor of Rogers, Arkansas, holding the post for 12 years. During his mayoralty, Womack sought to crack down on illegal immigration by assigning two Immigration and Naturalization Service agents to the Rogers Police Department. As a result, the Mexican American Legal Defense and Educational Fund filed a class-action suit against the city's police force, accusing it of racial profiling.

== U.S. House of Representatives ==
=== Elections ===
==== 2010 ====
In late 2009, Womack jumped into the race for the 3rd District after incumbent Representative John Boozman announced that he would run for the United States Senate. The 3rd is one of the most Republican districts in the South and the nation (Republicans have held it since 1967), and it was generally believed that whoever won the Republican primary would be the district's next representative. Womack ranked first in the seven-candidate primary with 31% of the vote. In the June runoff, he defeated state Senator and fellow Rogers resident Cecile Bledsoe, 52%–48%.

In the general election, Womack defeated Democratic nominee David Whitaker, 72%–28%.

==== 2012 ====
Womack was originally set to face veteran Ken Aden in his reelection bid, but Aden withdrew from the race on July 8, after admitting to exaggerating his military record. As it was too late to select a replacement candidate for Aden (under Arkansas law, the Democratic Party could only name a replacement at that date if the original candidate died, moved out of the district or opted to seek another office), Womack faced no major-party opposition in November. He was reelected with 76% of the vote, defeating Rebekah Kennedy (Green Party of the United States, 16%) and David Pangrac (Libertarian Party (United States), 8%).

==== 2014 ====
Thomas Brewer, a math teacher and minister, originally announced he was challenging Womack for the Republican nomination, and Troy Gittings, a high school English teacher and stand-up comedian, had announced he was running for the Democratic nomination. But neither Brewer nor Gittings ended up filing, leaving Libertarian Grant Brand as Womack's only challenger. He was reelected with 79% of the vote to Brand's 21%.

==== 2016 ====
Womack again faced no Democratic candidate in the general election. He defeated Libertarian Steve Isaacson 77%–23%.

==== 2018 ====
Womack faced a Republican primary challenge from Robb Ryerse, a self-described "progressive Republican." He defeated Ryerse, 84%–16%.

In the general election, Womack faced Democratic opposition for the first time as an incumbent. Womack defeated Josh Mahoney, president of the Arkansas Single Parent Scholarship Fund and former chairman of the Fayetteville Airport Commission, and Libertarian Michael Kalagias, on election day, 65%–33%-2%, his smallest margin of victory to date.

==== 2020 ====
Womack did not face a challenge in the Republican primary, and he defeated the Democratic nominee, nurse practitioner Celeste Williams, and Kalagias, 64%–32%-4%.

==== 2022 ====
Womack won reelection against Democratic nominee, Lauren Mallett-Hays, and Kalagias, with 63.7% to 32.9% and 3.4%.

==== 2024 ====
2024 GOP primary map Womack 50–60%

Womack won renomination with 54% of the vote, defeating state senator Clint Penzo in the Republican primary.

=== Tenure ===
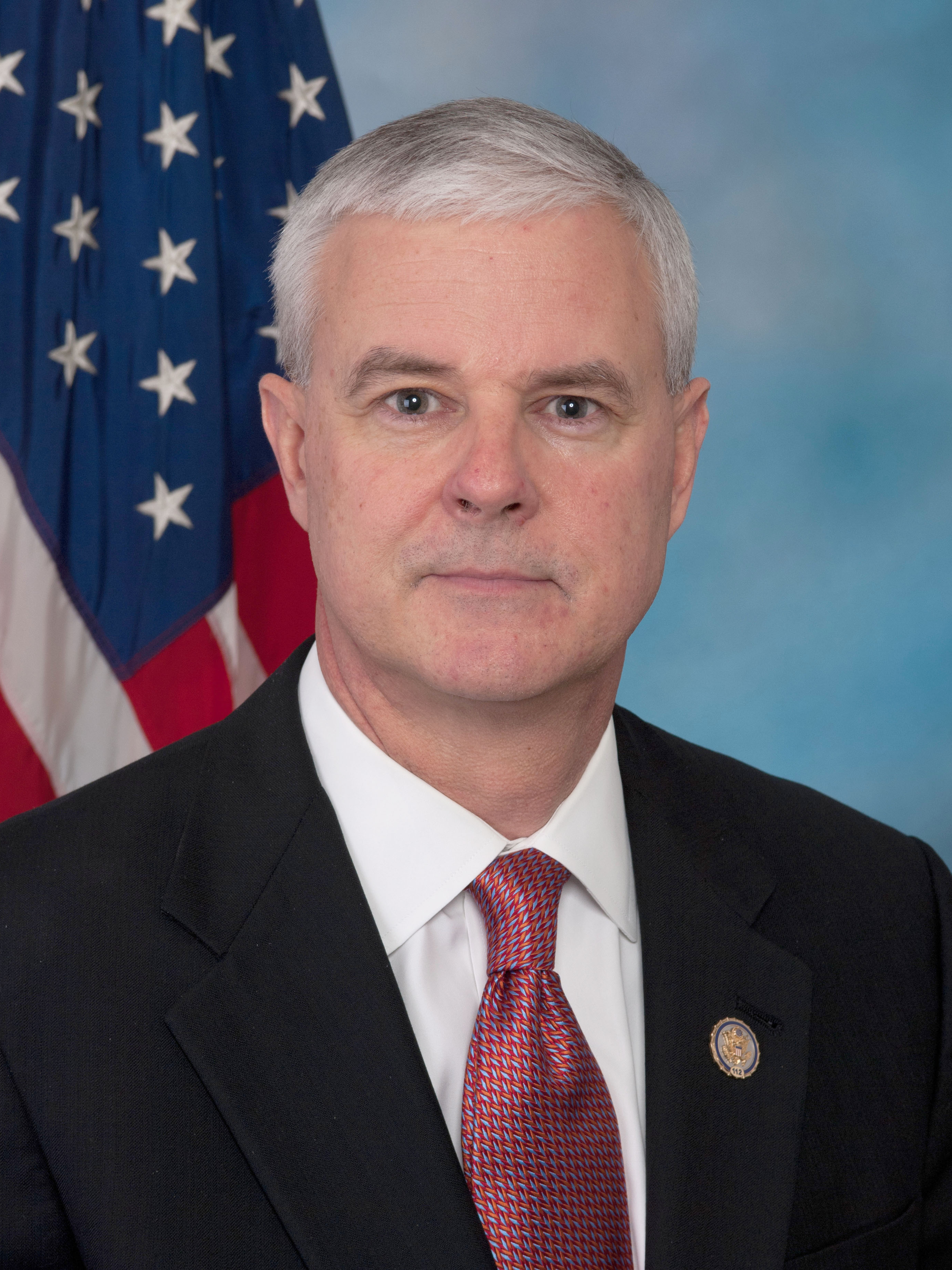
Womack during the 112th Congress

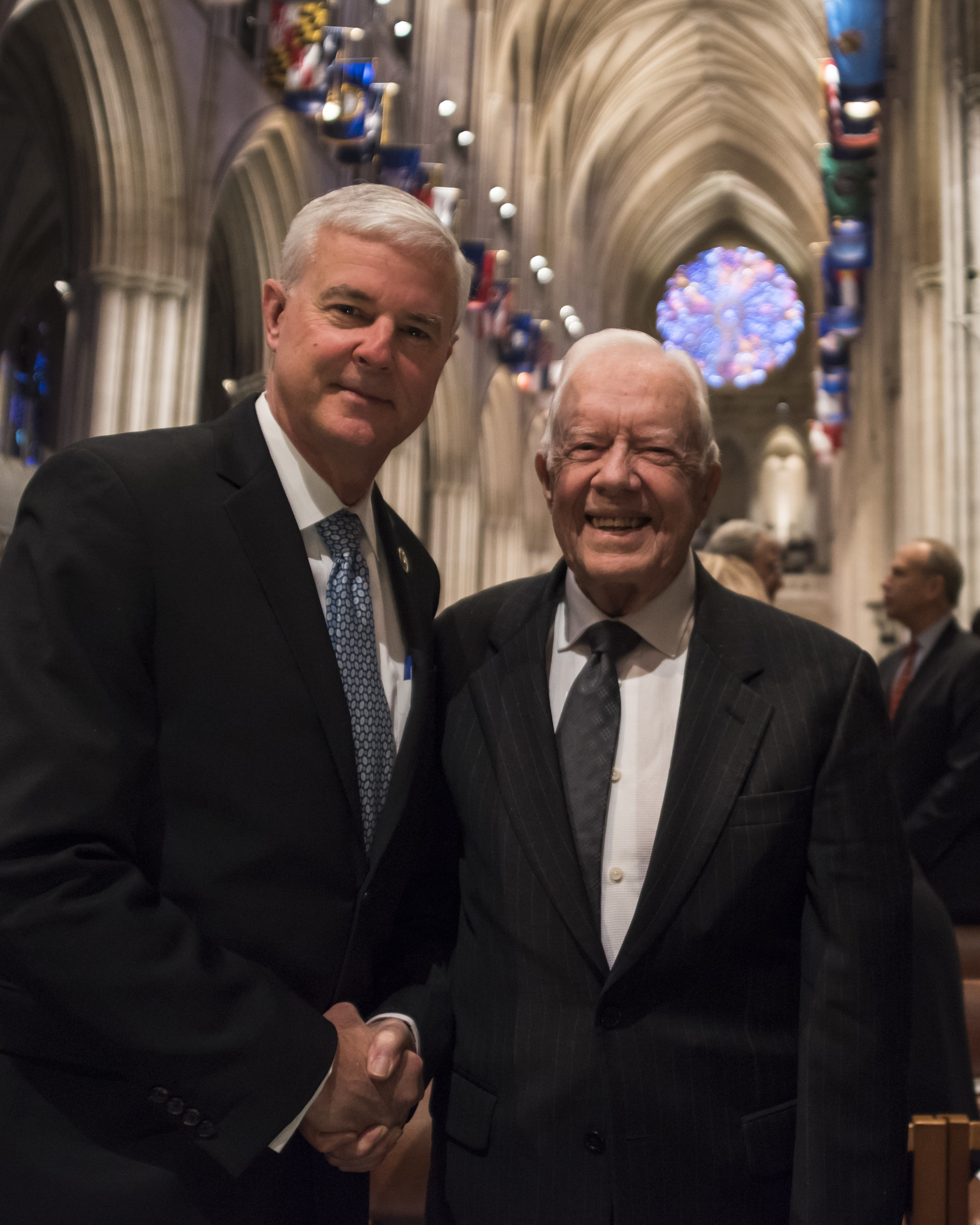
Womack with former President Jimmy Carter during the state funeral of former President George H. W. Bush in December 2018

In 2010, Womack signed a pledge sponsored by Americans for Prosperity promising to vote against any global warming legislation that would raise taxes.

Womack was a member of the House Appropriations Committee when in 2014 lawmakers inserted a prohibition into an appropriations bill that would prevent USDA staff from working on finishing regulations related to the meat industry.

In a 2015 episode of his show Last Week Tonight with John Oliver, John Oliver criticized Womack for blocking the enforcement of laws proposed by the Grain Inspection, Packers and Stockyards Administration that were designed to protect chicken farmers from being threatened or punished by the companies they work for if they spoke out regarding their farming experiences.

In 2015, Womack condemned the Supreme Court ruling in Obergefell v. Hodges, which held that same-sex marriage bans violated the constitution.

In December 2017, Womack voted for the Tax Cuts and Jobs Act of 2017.

A staunch Kevin McCarthy ally, Womack presided over the process to remove McCarthy as Speaker, which he opposed.

=== Committee assignments ===
For the 118th Congress:

- Committee on Appropriations
  - Subcommittee on Defense
  - Subcommittee on Financial Services and General Government
  - Subcommittee on Transportation, Housing and Urban Development, and Related Agencies (Chair)

=== Caucus memberships ===
- United States Congressional International Conservation Caucus
- Republican Governance Group
- House Republican Conference
- House Republican Steering Committee
- House Republican Policy Committee
- Congressional Caucus on Turkey and Turkish Americans
- Congressional Ukraine Caucus

== Political positions ==
=== Abortion ===
Womack supported the ruling in Dobbs v. Jackson Women's Health Organization, which ended the federal constitutional right to abortion and returned regulatory authority to the states.

=== Jim Jordan speakership nomination ===
Womack was one of 18 Republicans who voted against Jim Jordan's nomination for Speaker of the House all three times.

=== 2020 election ===
Womack did not join the majority of Republican members of Congress who signed an amicus brief in support of Texas v. Pennsylvania, a lawsuit filed at the United States Supreme Court contesting the results of the 2020 presidential election. Womack voted to certify both Arizona's and Pennsylvania's results in the 2021 United States Electoral College vote count.

On May 19, 2021, Womack was one of 35 Republicans to join all 217 Democrats present in voting to approve legislation to establish the January 6 commission meant to investigate the storming of the U.S. Capitol.

== Personal life ==
Womack attends Cross Church Pinnacle Hills, a Southern Baptist church in Rogers, Arkansas. He and his wife, Terri, were married on August 4, 1984, and were married for 41 years until her death on January 18, 2026. They had three sons and three grandsons. Womack lives in Rogers.

His son, James Phillip Womack was sentenced in 2024 to eight years in prison for distributing methamphetamine. In January 2026, his remaining federal prison sentence was commuted by President Donald Trump.

== Electoral history ==
Year	Office	District	Democratic		Republican		Libertarian		Other	
2010	U.S. House of Representatives	Arkansas's 3rd district	David Whitaker	27.56%	Steve Womack	72.44%				
2012	U.S. House of Representatives	Arkansas's 3rd district			Steve Womack	75.9%	David Pangrac	8.09%	Rebekah Kennedy (G)	16.01%
2014	U.S. House of Representatives	Arkansas's 3rd district			Steve Womack	79.41%	Grant Brand	20.59%		
2016	U.S. House of Representatives	Arkansas's 3rd district			Steve Womack	77.31%	Steve Isaacson	22.69%		
2018	U.S. House of Representatives	Arkansas's 3rd district	Joshua Mahony	32.65%	Steve Womack	64.78%	Michael Kalagias	2.57%		
2020	U.S. House of Representatives	Arkansas's 3rd district	Celeste Williams	31.81%	Steve Womack	64.31%	Michael Kalagias	3.88%		
2022	U.S. House of Representatives	Arkansas's 3rd district	Lauren Mallett-Hays	32.89%	Steve Womack	63.69%	Michael Kalagias	3.42%		
2024	U.S. House of Representatives	Arkansas's 3rd district	Caitlin Draper	31.8%	Steve Womack	63.8%	Bobby Wilson	4.4%		

U.S. House of Representatives
Preceded by John Boozman	Member of the U.S. House of Representatives from Arkansas's 3rd congressional district 2011–present	Incumbent
Preceded by Diane Black	Chair of the House Budget Committee; 2018–2019	Succeeded by John Yarmuth
New office	Chair of the Joint Budget and Appropriations Reform Committee; 2018–2019	Position abolished
Preceded by John Yarmuth	Ranking Member of the House Budget Committee; 2019–2021	Succeeded by Jason Smith
U.S. order of precedence (ceremonial)
Preceded by Frederica Wilson	United States representatives by seniority 92nd	Succeeded by Mark Amodei
