= United States Congressional Joint Select Committee on Budget and Appropriations Process Reform =

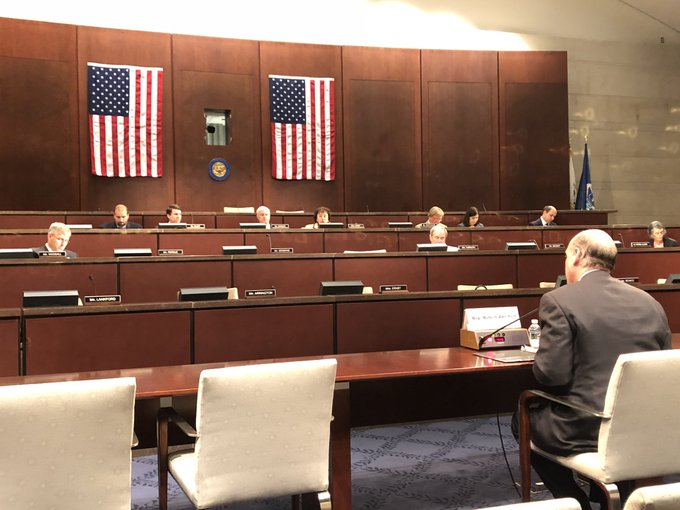
Robert Aderholt speaking in front of the Join Select Committee on Budget and Appropriations Process Reform in 2018

The Joint Select Committee on Budget and Appropriations Process Reform was established on February 9, 2018 during the 115th United States Congress under Section 30442 of H.R. 1892.

== Members, 115th Congress ==
| | Majority | Minority |
| Senate members | Roy Blunt, Missouri; David Perdue, Georgia; James Lankford, Oklahoma; Joni Ernst, Iowa | Sheldon Whitehouse, Rhode Island; Brian Schatz, Hawaii; Michael Bennet, Colorado; Mazie Hirono, Hawaii |
| House members | Steve Womack, Arkansas, Co-Chair; Pete Sessions, Texas; Rob Woodall, Georgia; Jodey Arrington, Texas | Nita Lowey, New York, Co-Chair; John Yarmuth, Kentucky; Lucille Roybal-Allard, California; Derek Kilmer, Washington |

== Text ==
=== Sec. 30442. establishment of joint select committee. ===
(a) Establishment of Joint Select Committee.— There is established a joint select committee of Congress to be known as the "Joint Select Committee on Budget and Appropriations Process Reform".

(b) Implementation.—

(1) Goal.— The goal of the joint committee is to reform the budget and appropriations process.
(2) Duties.—

(A) In general.— The joint committee shall provide recommendations and legislative language that will significantly reform the budget and appropriations process.
(B) Report, recommendations, and legislative language.—

(i) In general.— Not later than November 30, 2018, the joint committee shall vote on—

(I) a report that contains a detailed statement of the findings, conclusions, and recommendations of the joint committee; and
(II) proposed legislative language to carry out the recommendations described in subclause (I).

(ii) Approval of report and legislative language.—

(I) In general.— The report of the joint committee and the proposed legislative language described in clause (i) shall only be approved upon receiving the votes of—

(aa) a majority of joint committee members appointed by the Speaker of the House of Representatives and the Majority Leader of the Senate; and
(bb) a majority of joint committee members appointed by the Minority Leader of the House of Representatives and the Minority Leader of the Senate.

(II) Availability.— The text of any report and proposed legislative language shall be publicly available in electronic form at least 24 hours prior to its consideration.

(iii) Additional views.— A member of the joint committee who gives notice of an intention to file supplemental, minority, or additional views at the time of the final joint committee vote on the approval of the report and legislative language under clause (ii) shall be entitled to 2 calendar days after the day of such notice in which to file such views in writing with the co-chairs. Such views shall then be included in the joint committee report and printed in the same volume, or part thereof, and their inclusion shall be noted on the cover of the report. In the absence of timely notice, the joint committee report may be printed and transmitted immediately without such views.
(iv) Transmission of report and legislative language.—

If the report and legislative language are approved by the joint committee pursuant to clause (ii), the joint committee shall submit the joint committee report and legislative language described in clause (i) to the President, the Vice President, the Speaker of the House of Representatives, and the majority and minority leaders of each House of Congress not later than 15 calendar days after such approval.

(v) Report and legislative language to be made public.— Upon the approval of the joint committee report and legislative language pursuant to clause (ii), the joint committee shall promptly make the full report and legislative language, and a record of any vote, available to the public.

(3) Membership.—

(A) In general.— The joint committee shall be composed of 16 members appointed pursuant to subparagraph (B).
(B) Appointment.— Members of the joint committee shall be appointed as follows:

(i) The Speaker of the House of Representatives shall appoint 4 members from among Members of the House of Representatives.
(ii) The Minority Leader of the House of Representatives shall appoint 4 members from among Members of the House of Representatives.
(iii) The Majority Leader of the Senate shall appoint 4 members from among Members of the Senate.
(iv) The Minority Leader of the Senate shall appoint 4 members from among Members of the Senate.

(C) Co-chairs.— Two of the appointed members of the joint committee will serve as co-chairs. The Speaker of the House of Representatives and the Majority Leader of the Senate shall jointly appoint one co-chair, and the Minority Leader of the House of Representatives and the Minority Leader of the Senate shall jointly appoint the second co-chair. The co-chairs shall be appointed not later than 14 calendar days after the date of enactment of this Act.
(D) Date.— Members of the joint committee shall be appointed not later than 14 calendar days after the date of enactment of this Act.
(E) Period of appointment.— Members shall be appointed for the life of the joint committee. Any vacancy in the joint committee shall not affect its powers, but shall be filled not later than 14 calendar days after the date on which the vacancy occurs, in the same manner as the original appointment was made. If a member of the joint committee ceases to be a Member of the House of Representatives or the Senate, as the case may be, the member is no longer a member of the joint committee and a vacancy shall exist.

(4) Administration.—

(A) General authority.— For purposes of enabling the joint committee to exercise its powers, functions, and duties under this subtitle, and consistent with the Standing Rules of the Senate, there is authorized from the date of enactment of this Act through February 28, 2019, $500,000 to be allocated—

(i) in total during the period October 1, 2017 through September 30, 2018; and
(ii) any remaining amounts shall be carried forward for the period October 1, 2018 through February 28, 2019.

(B) Expenses.— Expenses of the joint committee shall be paid from the contingent fund of the Senate upon vouchers approved by the co-chairs, subject to the rules and regulations of the Senate.
(C) Quorum.— Nine members of the joint committee shall constitute a quorum for purposes of voting and meeting, and 5 members of the joint committee shall constitute a quorum for holding hearings.
(D) Voting.— No proxy voting shall be allowed on behalf of the members of the joint committee.
(E) Meetings.—

(i) Initial meeting.— Not later than 30 calendar days after the date of enactment of this Act, the joint committee shall hold its first meeting.
(ii) Agenda.— The co-chairs of the joint committee shall provide an agenda to the joint committee members not less than 48 hours in advance of any meeting.

(F) Hearings.—

(i) In general.— The joint committee may, for the purpose of carrying out this section, hold such hearings, sit and act at such times and places, require attendance of witnesses and production of books, papers, and documents, take such testimony, receive such evidence, and administer such oaths as the joint committee considers advisable.
(ii) Hearing procedures and responsibilities of co-chairs.—

(I) Announcement.— The co-chairs of the joint committee shall make a public announcement of the date, place, time, and subject matter of any hearing to be conducted, not less than 7 days in advance of such hearing, unless the co-chairs determine that there is good cause to begin such hearing at an earlier date.
(II) Equal representation of witnesses.— Each co-chair shall be entitled to select an equal number of witnesses for each hearing held by the joint committee.
(III) Written statement.— A witness appearing before the joint committee shall file a written statement of proposed testimony at least 2 calendar days before the appearance of the witness, unless the requirement is waived by the co-chairs, following their determination that there is good cause for failure to comply with such requirement.

(G) Minimum number of public meetings and hearings.— The joint committee shall hold—

(i) not less than a total of 5 public meetings or public hearings; and
(ii) not less than 3 public hearings, which may include field hearings.

(H) Technical assistance.— Upon written request of the co-chairs, a Federal agency, including legislative branch agencies, shall provide technical assistance to the joint committee in order for the joint committee to carry out its duties.
(I) Staffing.—

(i) Details.— Employees of the legislative branch may be detailed to the joint committee on a nonreimbursable basis, consistent with the rules and regulations of the Senate.
(ii) Staff director.— The co-chairs, acting jointly, may designate one such employee as staff director of the joint committee.

(c) Ethical Standards.— Members on the joint committee who serve in the House of Representatives shall be governed by the ethics rules and requirements of the House. Members of the Senate who serve on the joint committee shall comply with the ethics rules of the Senate.

(d) Termination.— The joint committee shall terminate on December 31, 2018 or 30 days after submission of its report and legislative recommendations pursuant to this section whichever occurs first.

=== Sec. 30443. funding. ===
(a) Special Reserve.— To enable the joint committee to exercise its powers, functions, and duties under this subtitle, within the funds in the account for "Expenses of Inquiries and Investigations" of the Senate, not more than $500,000 shall be allocated from the special reserve established in S.Res. 62, agreed to February 28, 2017 (115th Congress), for use by the joint committee.

(b) Expiration.— None of the funds made available by this section may be available for obligation by the joint committee after January 2,

2019.

(c) Availability Requirements.— For purposes of the joint committee, section 20(b) of S.Res. 62, agreed to February 28, 2017

(115th Congress), shall not apply.

=== Sec. 30444. consideration of joint committee bill in the senate. ===
(a) Introduction.— Upon receipt of proposed legislative language approved in accordance with section 30442(b)(2)(B)(ii), the language shall be introduced in the Senate (by request) on the next day on which the Senate is in session by the Majority Leader of the Senate or by a Member of the Senate designated by the Majority Leader of the Senate.

(b) Committee Consideration.— A joint committee bill introduced in the Senate under subsection (a) shall be referred to the Committee on the Budget, which shall report the bill without any revision and with a favorable recommendation, an unfavorable recommendation, or without recommendation, no later than 7 session days after introduction of the bill. If the Committee on the Budget fails to report the bill within that period, the committee shall be automatically discharged from consideration of the bill, and the bill shall be placed on the appropriate calendar.

(c) Motion to Proceed to Consideration.—

(1) In general.— Notwithstanding rule XXII of the Standing Rules of the Senate, it is in order, not later than 2 days of session after the date on which a joint committee bill is reported or discharged from the Committee on the Budget, for the Majority Leader of the Senate or the Majority Leader's designee to move to proceed to the consideration of the joint committee bill. It shall also be in order for any Member of the Senate to move to proceed to the consideration of the joint committee bill at any time after the conclusion of such 2-day period.
(2) Consideration of motion.— Consideration of the motion to proceed to the consideration of the joint committee bill and all debatable motions and appeals in connection therewith shall not exceed 10 hours, which shall be divided equally between the Majority and Minority Leaders or their designees. A motion to further limit debate is in order, shall require an affirmative vote of three-fifths of Members duly chosen and sworn, and is not debatable.
(3) Vote threshold.— The motion to proceed to the consideration of the joint committee bill shall only be agreed to upon an affirmative vote of three-fifths of Members duly chosen and sworn.
(4) Limitations.— The motion is not subject to a motion to postpone. All points of order against the motion to proceed to the joint committee bill are waived. A motion to reconsider the vote by which the motion is agreed to or disagreed to shall not be in order.
(5) Deadline.— Not later than the last day of the 115th Congress, the Senate shall vote on a motion to proceed to the joint committee bill.

(d) Rules of Senate.— This section is enacted by Congress—

(1) as an exercise of the rulemaking power of the Senate, and as such is deemed a part of the rules of the Senate, but applicable only with respect to the procedure to be followed in the Senate in the case of a joint committee bill, and supersede other rules only to the extent that they are inconsistent with such rules; and
(2) with full recognition of the constitutional right of the Senate to change the rules (so far as relating to the procedure of the Senate) at any time, in the same manner, and to the same extent as in the case of any other rule of the Senate.
