= Monte Hodges =

American politician

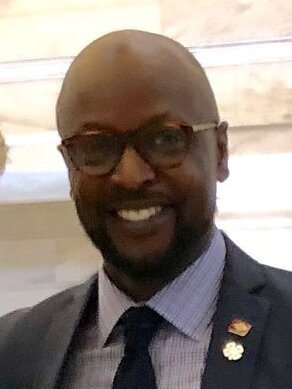
- Hodges in 2019

Member of the Arkansas House of Representatives from the 55th district
- In office January 14, 2013 – January 9, 2023
- Preceded by: Tommy Baker
- Succeeded by: Matthew Brown

Personal details
- Born: November 1, 1971 (age 54) Blytheville, Arkansas
- Party: Democratic
- Education: Mississippi County Community College; Arkansas State University
- Profession: Banker

Monte Hodges (born November 1, 1971) is an American politician, who served as a member of the Arkansas House of Representatives representing District 55 from 2013 to 2023. A member of the Democratic Party, he was a candidate for U.S. congress in Arkansas's 1st congressional district in the 2022 United States House of Representatives elections in Arkansas, in which he lost to incumbent Republican Rick Crawford.

== Education ==
Hodges earned his AA from Mississippi County Community College and his bachelor's degree in business administration from Arkansas State University.

== Elections ==
- 2012 To challenge District 55 incumbent Republican Representative Tommy Baker left the Legislature and left the seat open, Hodges placed first in the May 22, 2012 Democratic Primary with 1,170 votes (38.9%), won the June 22 runoff election with 1,764 votes (56.2%), and was unopposed for the November 6, 2012 General election.

In 2014, he was unchallenged for reelection to the seat. In 2016, he was unchallenged for reelection to the seat. In 2018, he beat Republican Gary Tobar for the seat. In 2020, he beat Republican Gary Tobar for the seat. In 2022, he ran for Arkansas's 1st congressional district and lost to Rick Crawford.
