= Colby Fulfer =

American politician

Member of the Arkansas Senate from the 7th district
- In office February 22, 2022 – January 9, 2023
- Preceded by: Lance Eads
- Succeeded by: Clint Penzo

Personal details
- Party: Republican

Colby Fulfer is an American politician who served in the Arkansas Senate representing the Springdale area from 2022 to 2023.

== Education ==
Fulfer graduated from the Shiloh Christian School.

== Career ==
Fulfer worked at the Westfield Chapel Funeral Home and serves as chief of staff to Springdale Mayor Doug Sprouse. A Republican, he was narrowly elected to the Arkansas Senate in a 2022 special election to replace Lance Eads, who had resigned in 2021.

He assumed office on February 22, 2022 and served during the fiscal session of the 93rd Arkansas General Assembly, as well as a special session called by Governor Asa Hutchinson, and did not seek reelection.

He was succeeded by State Representative Clint Penzo.

== Electoral history ==
Fulfer was elected to the Arkansas Senate in the Special Election held in February 2022. In the Republican primary, he received the highest number of votes but because he did not break 50% of the vote went to a runoff election against first-time candidate Steve Unger. In the runoff election, he defeated Unger narrowly 52-48%.

In the special general election, he defeated Democrat Lisa Parks by just 32 votes, or 0.8%.

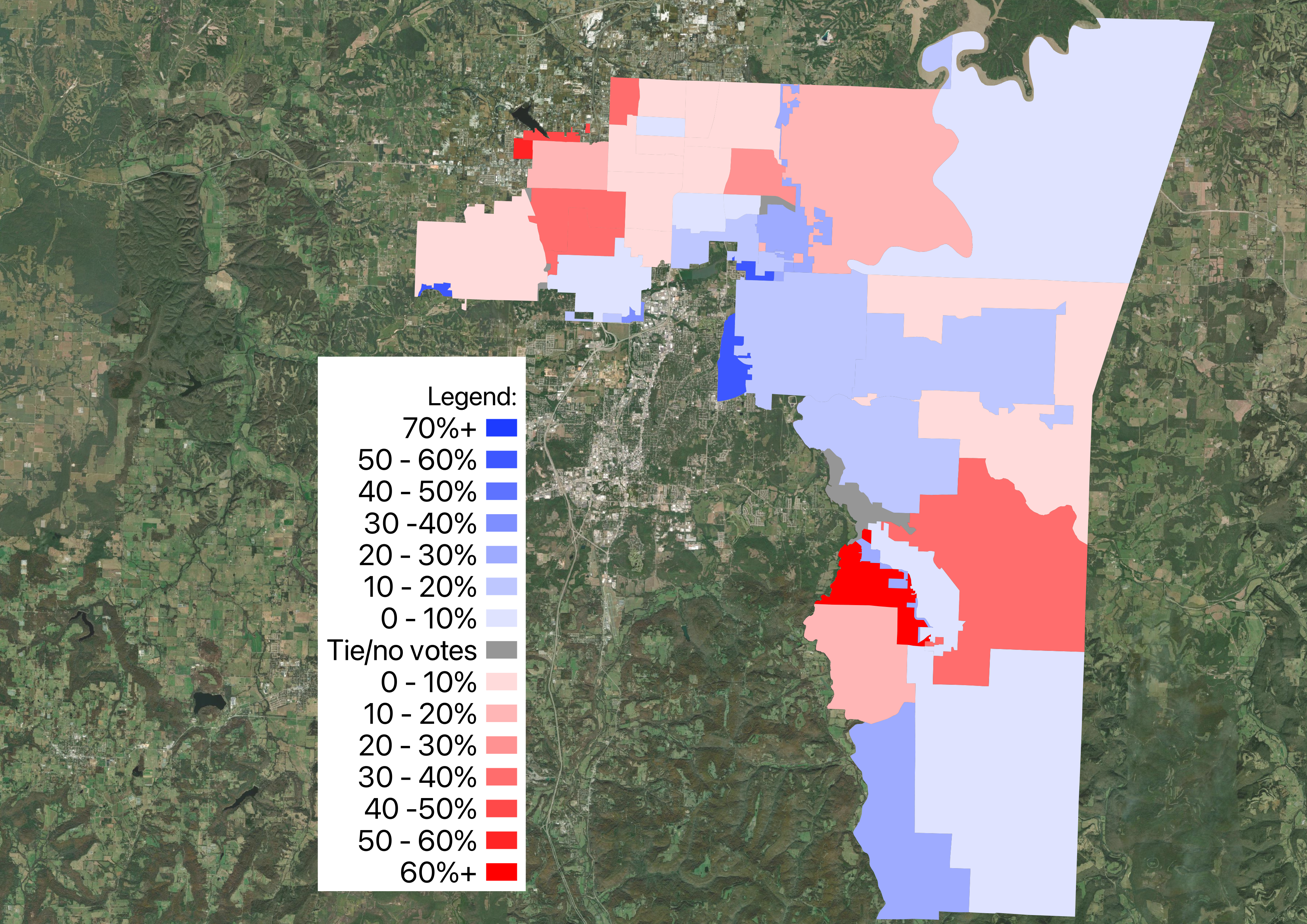

2021 Arkansas State Senate 7th district special election Republican primary
Party	Candidate	Votes	%
Republican	Colby Fulfer	1,388	46.66
Republican	Steve Unger	943	31.7
Republican	Jim Bob Duggar	456	15.33
Republican	Edge Nowlin	188	6.32
Total votes		2,975	100.0

2021 Arkansas State Senate 7th district special general election
Party	Candidate	Votes	%
Republican	Colby Fulfer	2,033	50.4
Democratic	Lisa Parks	2,001	49.6
Total votes		4,034	100.0
