= Lance Eads =

American politician

Member of the Arkansas Senate from the 7th district
- In office 2017–2021
- Preceded by: Jon Woods
- Succeeded by: Colby Fulfer

Member of the Arkansas House of Representatives from the 88th district
- In office 2015–2017
- Preceded by: Randy Alexander
- Succeeded by: Clint Penzo

Personal details
- Born: Lance Ronald Eads; August 5, 1968 (age 57)
- Party: Republican
- Education: Ouachita Baptist University (BS)

Lance Ronald Eads (born August 5, 1968) is an American politician who served as a member of the Arkansas Senate for the 7th district from 2017 to 2021.

== Education ==
After graduating from Prairie Grove High School, Eads earned a Bachelor of Science degree in education from Ouachita Baptist University.

== Career ==
From 1993 to 2003, Eads worked as a branch manager for Staffmark. From 2003 to 2010, he was the business development officer for the 66 Federal Credit Union. He also served as a justice of the peace for Washington County, Arkansas. From 2010 to 2021, he was vice president of the Springdale Chamber of Commerce for government affairs. Eads represented the 88th district in the Arkansas House of Representatives from 2015 to 2017. He was elected to the Arkansas Senate in November 2016 and assumed office in 2017. During his tenure, he served as chair of the Joint Energy Committee and Senate Rules, Resolutions and Memorials Committee. Eads resigned from the Senate in 2021 to take a consulting position at the Capitol Consulting Firm in Little Rock, Arkansas.
