= Clint Penzo =

American politician

Member of the Arkansas Senate from the 31st district
- Incumbent
- Assumed office January 9, 2023
- Preceded by: Colby Fulfer

Member of the Arkansas House of Representatives from the 88th district
- In office January 9, 2017 – January 9, 2023
- Preceded by: Lance Eads
- Succeeded by: Steve Unger

Personal details
- Born: Tontitown, Arkansas, U.S.
- Party: Republican
- Spouse: Allison Penzo
- Education: Northwest Arkansas Community College (AAS); University of Arkansas (BS)

Clint Penzo is an American politician and businessman serving as a member of the Arkansas Senate representing the Springdale area. He previously served in the Arkansas House of Representatives from 2017 to 2023.

== Early life and education ==
Penzo was born in Tontitown, Arkansas. He earned an Associate of Applied Science in physical therapy from Northwest Arkansas Community College and a Bachelor of Science in geological and Earth sciences from the University of Arkansas.

== Career ==
From 2000 to 2005, Penzo worked as a physical therapy assistant at Encompass Health. He later became a real estate agent for Century 21. He served as a member of the Tontitown City Council for two years before losing a campaign for Tontitown Mayor in 2014 by an 11% margin. Penzo was elected to the Arkansas House of Representatives in November 2016 and assumed office in January 2017. He also served as vice chair of the Joint Energy Committee.

In 2021, he announced he would not run for reelection and would run for State Senate District 31. On November 8, 2022 he was elected to the State Senate over Democrat Lisa Parks by a margin of 60-40%.

In November 2023, Penzo announced he would run in Arkansas's 3rd congressional district in the 2024 United States House of Representatives elections, challenging incumbent Republican congressman Steve Womack. Penzo criticized Womack as insufficiently conservative for the district. Womack defeated Penzo 54–46 in the primary.

On March 11 2025, Penzo was one of the few Republicans, who voted against a nitrogen hypoxia death penalty method bill.

== Controversy ==
The Northwest Arkansas Democrat Gazette reported during Penzo’s 2016 campaign for State Representative that he had failed to pay nearly $21,000 in income taxes. Penzo stated he had since paid off the tax liens.
