= Rick Crawford (politician) =

American politician (born 1966)

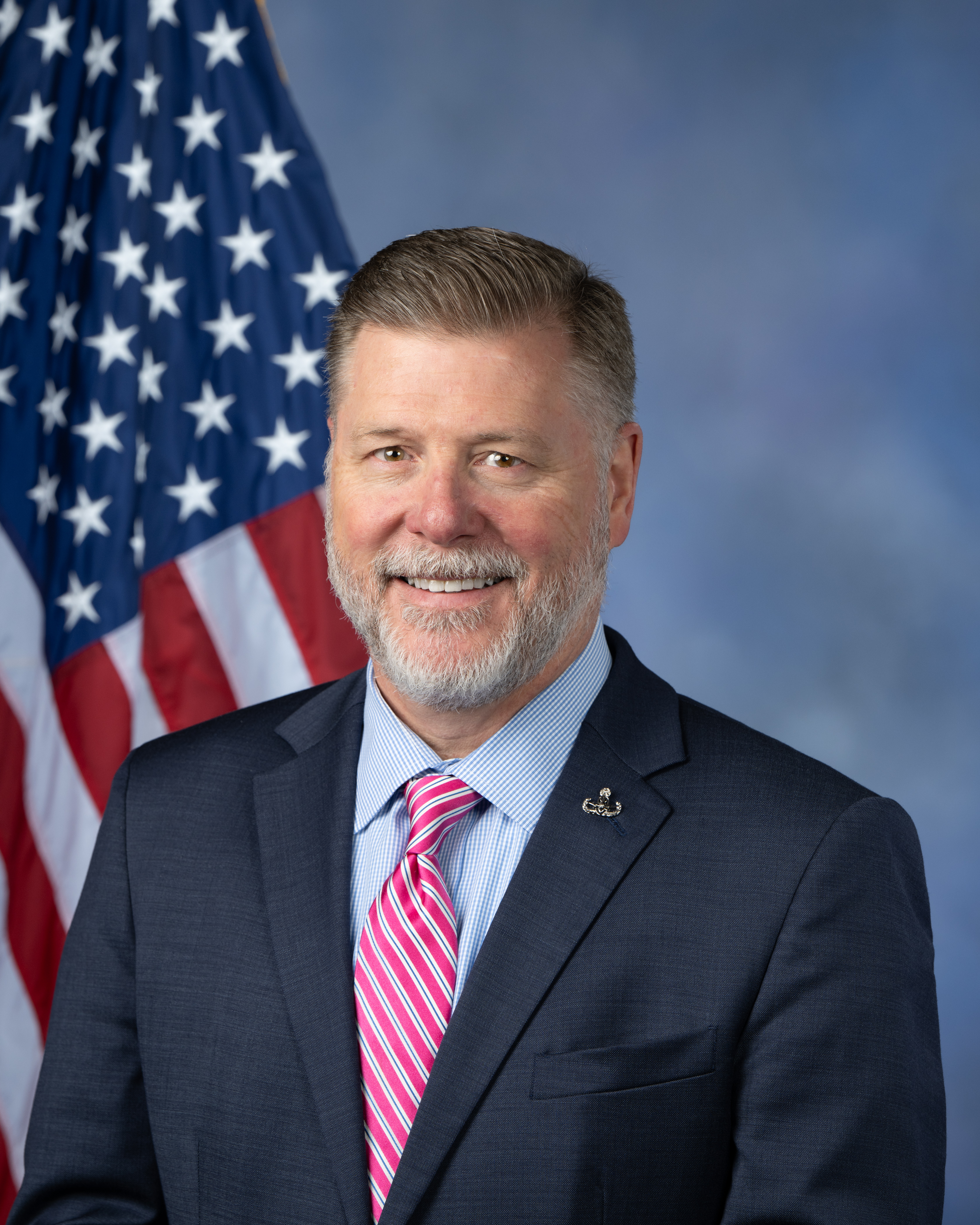
- Official portrait, 2024

Chair of the House Intelligence Committee
- Incumbent
- Assumed office January 16, 2025
- Preceded by: Mike Turner

Member of the U.S. House of Representatives from Arkansas's 1st district
- Incumbent
- Assumed office January 3, 2011
- Preceded by: Marion Berry

Personal details
- Born: Eric Alan Crawford; January 22, 1966 (age 60) Homestead Air Force Base, Florida, U.S.
- Party: Republican
- Spouse: Stacy Crawford
- Children: 2
- Education: Arkansas State University (BS)
- Website: House website Campaign website

Military service
- Branch/service: United States Army
- Years of service: 1985–1989
- Rank: Sergeant
- Unit: 56th Ordnance Detachment
- Awards: Army Achievement Medal; Army Good Conduct Medal; Explosive Ordnance Disposal Badge

Eric Alan "Rick" Crawford (born January 22, 1966) is an American politician serving as the U.S. representative for Arkansas's 1st congressional district since 2011. He is a member of the Republican Party.

Crawford was first elected to Congress in 2010. Prior to entering politics, Crawford had a career as a rodeo cowboy, musician, radio announcer, and radio station owner. In 2025, he was elected to serve as chairman of the House Intelligence Committee for the 119th Congress.

== Early life and education ==
Crawford was born at Homestead Air Force Base in Florida, the son of Ruth Anne and Donnie J. "Don" Crawford. He grew up in a military family; his father served in the United States Air Force. He graduated from Alvirne High School in Hudson, New Hampshire. Crawford enlisted in the United States Army and served as an explosive ordnance disposal technician assigned to the 56th Ordnance Detachment at Fort Indiantown Gap in Pennsylvania. He left the U.S. Army after four years' service at the rank of Sergeant. After his service, Crawford attended Arkansas State University in Jonesboro, Arkansas, graduating in 1996 with a Bachelor of Science in agriculture business and economics.

== Rodeo and music career ==
In 1993, Crawford was seriously injured in a rodeo accident. He transitioned into a career in radio announcing for the rodeo. He also launched a music career, and has been called a "singing cowboy" as he sometimes performed his music while riding a horse. In 1994, Legacy, Inc. released his album Crackin' Out, recorded at Haage Studios in Kirbyville, Missouri. Crawford dedicated the project to "that dyin' breed called 'Cowboy'".

== Radio career ==
Crawford was a news anchor and agri-reporter on KAIT-TV in Jonesboro and farm director on KFIN-FM. He owned and operated the AgWatch Network, a farm news network heard on 39 radio stations in Arkansas, Missouri, Tennessee, Mississippi, and Kentucky.

== U.S. House of Representatives ==
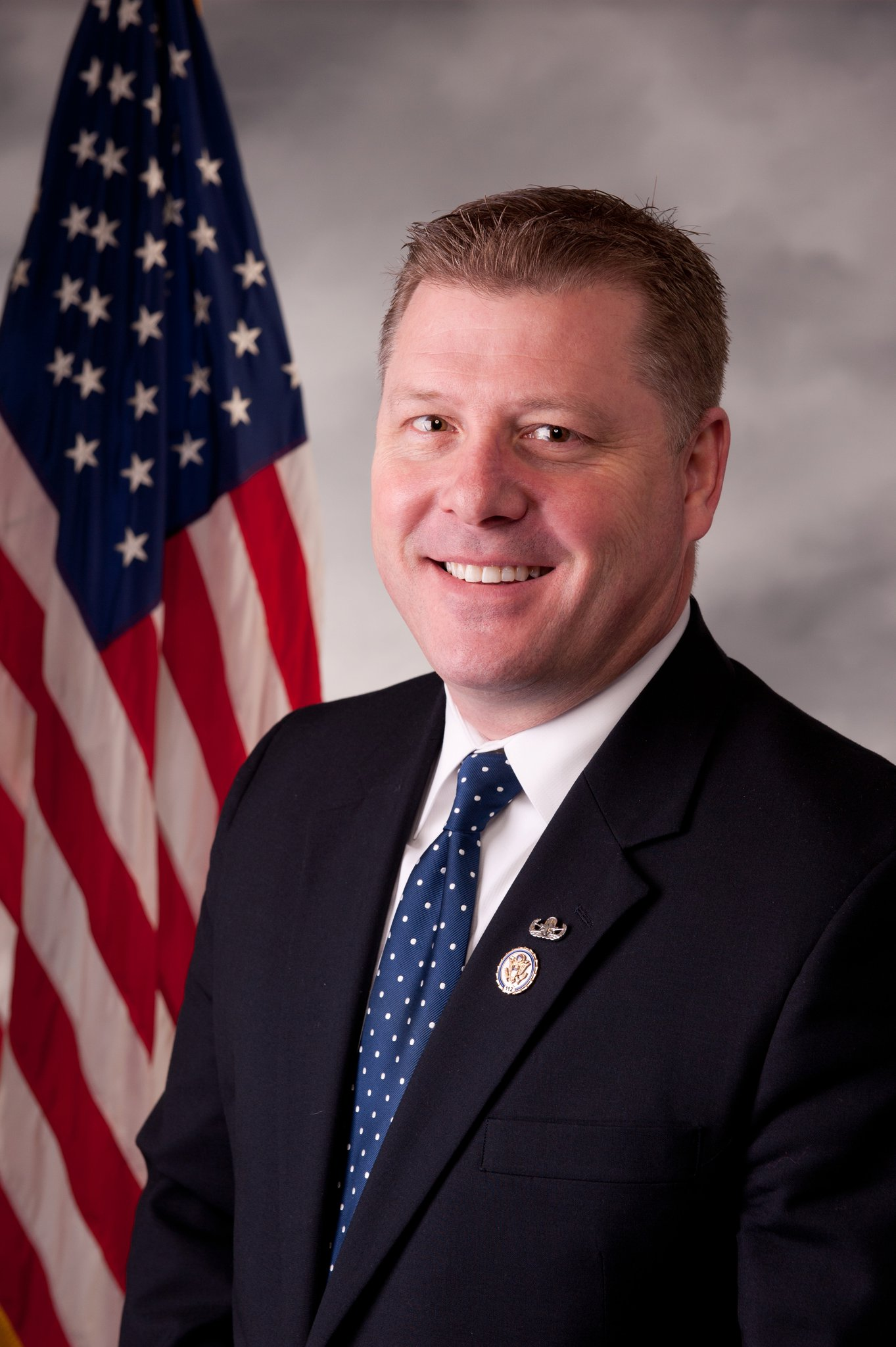
Crawford's freshman portrait (112th Congress)

=== Elections ===
==== 2010 ====
Crawford ran for Arkansas's 1st congressional district after U.S. representative Marion Berry decided to retire. He was endorsed by Governor Tim Pawlenty of Minnesota, former Arkansas governor Mike Huckabee, former federal official Asa Hutchinson, and former U.S. representative Ed Bethune. He won the Republican primary, defeating Princella Smith, 72% to 28%, and the general election, defeating Berry's chief of staff Chad Causey, 52% to 43%.

==== 2012 ====
Crawford was reelected, defeating Democratic nominee Scott Ellington, 56% to 39%.

==== 2014 ====
Crawford was reelected to a third term, defeating Heber Springs Mayor Jackie McPherson, 63% to 32%.

==== 2016 ====
Crawford was reelected to a fourth term, defeating Libertarian candidate Mark West, 76% to 24%.

==== 2018 ====
Crawford was reelected to a fifth term, defeating Democratic nominee Chinton Desai, 69% to 29%.

==== 2020 ====
Crawford was reelected unopposed.

==== 2022 ====
Crawford was reelected to a seventh term, defeating the Democratic nominee, Arkansas State Representative Monte Hodges, 74% to 26%.

==== 2024 ====
Crawford was reelected to an eight term, defeating Democratic nominee Rodney Govens, 73% to 24%.

==== 2026 ====
Crawford is running for reelection. He was unopposed in the Republican primary and will face Democratic nominee Terri Yarbrough Green in the general election.

=== Tenure ===
On January 5, 2011, Crawford was sworn into office as a member of the 112th Congress. He is the first Republican to represent his district since Reconstruction. The last Republican to represent the district was Asa Hodges, who vacated the seat on March 3, 1875. Crawford is a member of the Republican Study Committee.

In 2010, Crawford signed a pledge sponsored by Americans for Prosperity to vote against any global warming legislation that would raise taxes.

Crawford supported President Donald Trump's 2017 executive order to impose a ban on travel to the U.S. by citizens of seven Muslim-majority countries, saying that the order was "designed to keep our nation safer" but that "Green card holders and aides of the U.S. military should be allowed entry."

Crawford voted for the Tax Cuts and Jobs Act of 2017. He believed the bill would make it easier for people to file their taxes and that "the vast majority of middle-income families in my district will get to keep more of their money to use as they wish." He also believed that local businesses would hire more and raise employees' pay in the wake of the bill's implementation.

In 2019, Crawford received a death threat from James Powell, a 43-year-old Arkansas resident. Powell was charged with "first-degree terroristic threatening" after an investigation by U.S. Capitol Police and the FBI. The charge carries a maximum six-year prison sentence and $10,000 fine.

Crawford opposed Obergefell v. Hodges, the Supreme Court ruling that same-sex marriage bans are unconstitutional.

In December 2020, Crawford was one of 126 Republican members of the House of Representatives to sign an amicus brief in support of Texas v. Pennsylvania, a lawsuit filed at the United States Supreme Court contesting the results of the 2020 presidential election, in which Joe Biden defeated Trump. The Supreme Court declined to hear the case on the basis that Texas lacked standing under Article III of the Constitution to challenge the results of an election held by another state.

As of October 2021, Crawford had voted in line with Joe Biden's stated position 7.5% of the time.

Crawford voted to provide Israel with support following 2023 Hamas attack on Israel.

=== Committee assignments ===
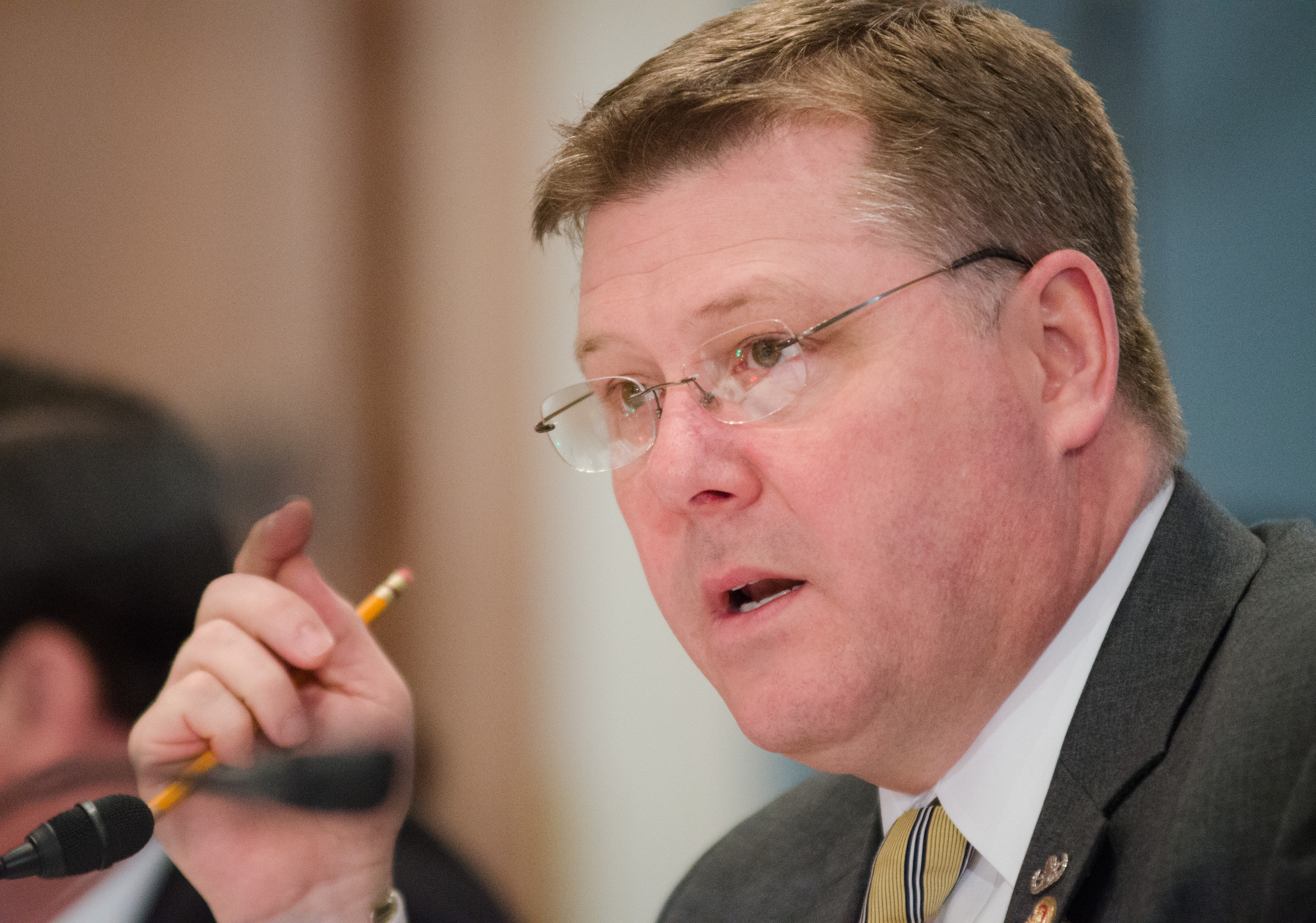
Congressman Crawford questions Secretary of Agriculture Tom Vilsack in 2013.

For the 119th Congress:

- Committee on Agriculture
  - Subcommittee on General Farm Commodities, Risk Management, and Credit
- Committee on Transportation and Infrastructure
  - Subcommittee on Water Resources and Environment
  - Subcommittee on Highways and Transit
- Permanent Select Committee on Intelligence (chair)

=== Caucus memberships ===
- Congressional Motorcycle Caucus
- Congressional Western Caucus

==== Temporary resignation ====
On November 8, 2019, Crawford announced he would temporarily resign from his seat on the House Intelligence Committee. Taking his place was Jim Jordan. This move allowed Jordan to lead President Donald Trump's public impeachment hearings. Crawford said he would resume his position once the "impeachment hoax" had concluded.

== Electoral history ==
Arkansas 1st Congressional District Republican primary election, 2010
Party	Candidate	Votes	%
Republican	Rick Crawford	14,461	71.79
Republican	Princella Smith	5,682	28.21
Total votes		20,143	100.00

Arkansas 1st Congressional District Election, 2010
Party	Candidate	Votes	%
Republican	Rick Crawford	93,224	51.79
Democratic	Chad Causey	78,267	43.48
Green	Ken Adler	8,320	4.62
Write-in		205	0.11
Total votes		180,016	100.00
Republican gain from Democratic			

Arkansas 1st Congressional District Election, 2012
Party	Candidate	Votes	%	±%
Republican	Rick Crawford (incumbent)	138,800	56.23	+4.44
Democratic	Scott Ellington	96,601	39.13	−4.35
Libertarian	Jessica Paxton	6,427	2.60	N/A
Green	Jacob Holloway	5,015	2.03	−2.59
Total votes		246,843	100.00	+37.12
Republican hold				

Arkansas 1st Congressional District election, 2014
Party	Candidate	Votes	%	±%
Republican	Rick Crawford (incumbent)	124,139	63.25	+7.02
Democratic	Jackie McPherson	63,555	32.38	−6.75
Libertarian	Brian Scott Willhite	8,562	4.36	+1.76
Total votes		196,256	100.00	−25.78
Republican hold				

Arkansas 1st Congressional District election, 2016
Party	Candidate	Votes	%	±%
Republican	Rick Crawford (incumbent)	183,866	76.28	+13.03
Libertarian	Mark West	57,181	23.72	+19.36
Total votes		241,047	100.00	+22.82
Republican hold				

Arkansas 1st Congressional District election, 2018
Party	Candidate	Votes	%	±%
Republican	Rick Crawford (incumbent)	138,757	68.95	−7.33
Democratic	Chintan Desai	57,907	28.77	N/A
Libertarian	Elvis Presley	4,581	2.28	−21.44
Total votes		201,245	100.00	−19.78
Republican hold				

Arkansas 1st Congressional District election, 2020
Party	Candidate	Votes	%	±%
Republican	Rick Crawford (incumbent)	237,596	100.00	+31.05
Total votes		237,596	100.00	+18.06
Republican hold				

Arkansas 1st Congressional District election, 2022
Party	Candidate	Votes	%	±%
Republican	Rick Crawford (incumbent)	153,774	73.80	−26.20
Democratic	Monte Hodges	54,598	26.20	N/A
Total votes		208,372	100.00	−14.02
Republican hold				

Arkansas's 1st congressional district election, 2024
Party	Candidate	Votes	%	±%
Republican	Rick Crawford (incumbent)	194,711	72.88	−0.92
Democratic	Rodney Govens	64,113	24.00	−2.20
Libertarian	Steve Parsons	8,353	3.13	N/A
Total votes		267,177	100.00	+28.22
Republican hold				

== Personal life ==
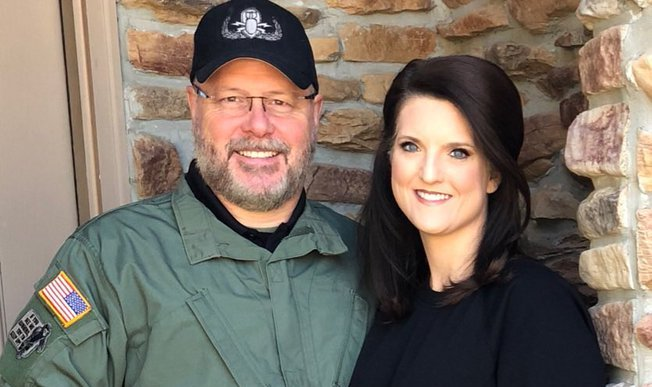
Rick and Stacy Crawford

Crawford and his wife, Stacy, live in Jonesboro with their children. He attends Central Baptist Church, a Southern Baptist congregation in Jonesboro. In 2023, Crawford released a novel titled The Stinger Proxy based on his Cold War experiences.

U.S. House of Representatives
Preceded by Marion Berry	Member of the U.S. House of Representatives from Arkansas's 1st congressional district 2011–present	Incumbent
Preceded by Mike Turner	Chair of the House Intelligence Committee; 2025–present	Incumbent
U.S. order of precedence (ceremonial)
Preceded by Kweisi Mfume	United States representatives by seniority 78th	Succeeded by Scott DesJarlais
