= 2014 Arkansas gubernatorial election =

- November 4, 2014
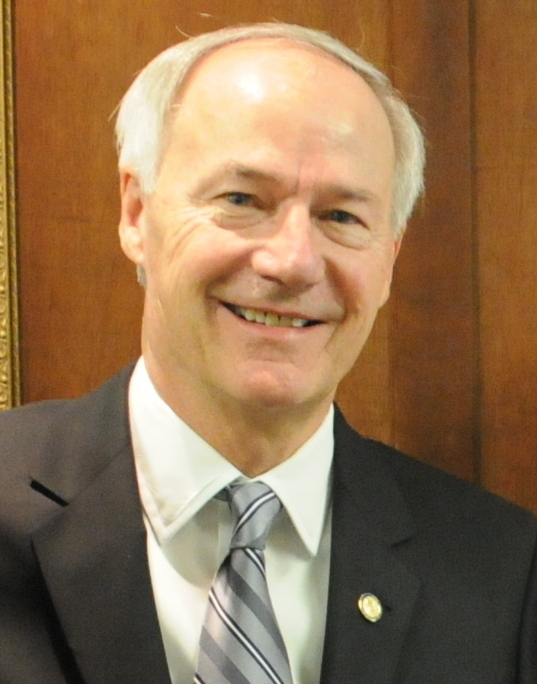

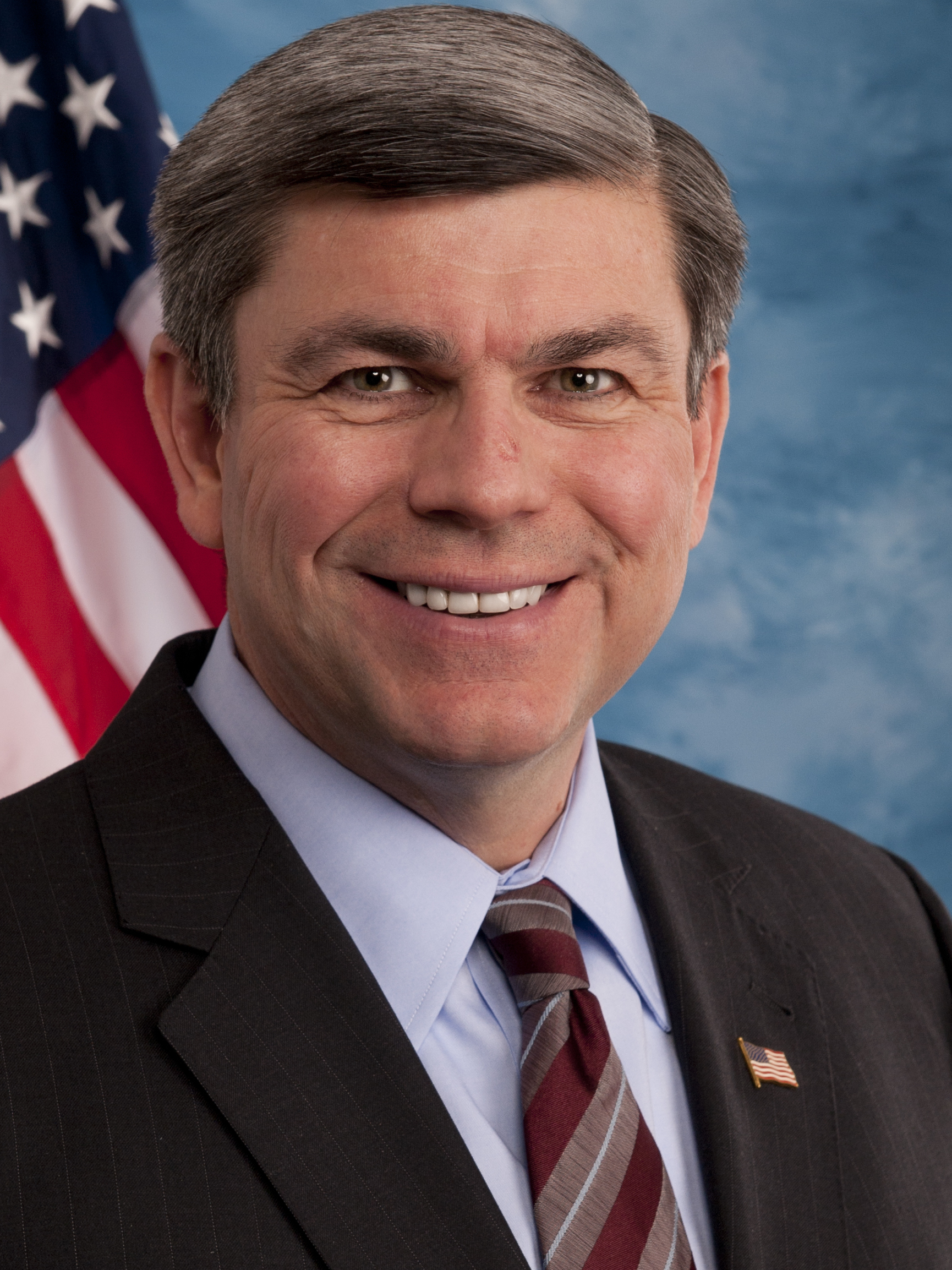
Nominee	Asa Hutchinson	Mike Ross
Party	Republican	Democratic
Popular vote	470,429	352,115
Percentage	55.44%	41.49%
- Hutchinson: 40–50% 50–60% 60–70% 70–80% Ross: 40–50% 50–60% 60–70%
Governor before election
Mike Beebe
Democratic
Elected Governor
Asa Hutchinson
Republican

The 2014 Arkansas gubernatorial election was held on November 4, 2014, to elect the governor of Arkansas, concurrently with the election to Arkansas's Class II U.S. Senate seat, as well as other elections to the United States Senate in other states and elections to the United States House of Representatives and various state and local elections. This was the last time the Arkansas governor changed partisan control.

Incumbent Governor Mike Beebe was ineligible to run for re-election due to term limits established by the Arkansas Constitution. Arkansas is one of nine states that limit governors to two terms for life. Democrats nominated former U.S. Representative Mike Ross and Republicans nominated former DEA Administrator, former U.S. Representative and 2006 Arkansas gubernatorial nominee Asa Hutchinson. This was the only Democratic-held governorship up for election in a state that Mitt Romney won in the 2012 presidential election.

Hutchinson won the general election by the largest margin recorded for a Republican in an open-seat gubernatorial race since Reconstruction, a record held until 2022. The race was called for Hutchinson roughly half an hour after the polls closed; his victory gave Republicans complete control of state government for the first time since 1874.

As of the 2026 gubernatorial election, this is the last time where the following counties voted Democratic: Ashley, Bradley, Clark, Dallas, Drew, Howard, Jackson, Lafayette, Lincoln, Little River, Mississippi, Monroe, Nevada, Ouachita, and Woodruff.

== Democratic primary ==
=== Candidates ===
==== Nominee ====
- Mike Ross, former U.S. representative

==== Eliminated in primary ====
- Lynette "Doc" Bryant, activist

==== Withdrew ====
- Bill Halter, former lieutenant governor of Arkansas and candidate for the U.S. Senate in 2010 (endorsed Ross)
- Dustin McDaniel, Arkansas attorney general

==== Declined ====
- Shane Broadway, interim director of the Department of Higher Education and former state senator
- John Burkhalter, former state highway commissioner (running for lieutenant governor)
- Conner Eldridge, U.S. attorney for the Western District of Arkansas
- G. David Gearhart, chancellor of the University of Arkansas
- Pat Hays, former mayor of North Little Rock (running for U.S. House)
- Keith Ingram, state senator (endorsed Ross)
- Bruce Maloch, state senator
- Michael Malone, president and CEO of the Northwest Arkansas Council
- Vic Snyder, former U.S. representative
- Paul Suskie, former chairman of the Arkansas Public Service Commission and candidate for attorney general of Arkansas in 2006
- Chris Thomason, chancellor of the University of Arkansas Community College at Hope and former state representative
- Robert F. Thompson, state senator (endorsed Ross)
- Darrin Williams, state representative, former speaker of the Arkansas House of Representatives

=== Endorsements ===
Mike Ross

National political figures

- Bill Clinton, former president of the United States

Arkansas political figures

- John Baine, state representative
- Mike Beebe, incumbent governor of Arkansas
- Paul Bookout, former state senator
- Mary Broadway, state representative
- Harry Brown, mayor of Stephens
- John Burkhalter, former state highway commissioner and nominee for lieutenant governor of Arkansas in 2014
- David Burnett, state senator
- JoAnne Bush, Republican mayor of Lake Village
- Eddie Cheatham, state senator
- Wesley Clark, retired U.S. general and candidate for president in 2004
- Curtis Coleman, businessman and former Republican candidate for governor in 2014
- Deborah Ferguson, state representative
- David Fielding, state representative
- Jimmie Lou Fisher, former Arkansas state treasurer, nominee for governor in 2002 and former president of the Arkansas Democratic Women's Club
- John Hall, county judge of Crawford County
- Bill Halter, former lieutenant governor of Arkansas and candidate for the U.S. Senate in 2010
- Fonda Hawthorne, state representative
- Sherman Hiatt, mayor of Charleston
- Keith Ingram, state senator
- David Johnson, state senator
- Sheila Lampkin, state representative
- Sue Madison, former state senator
- Allen Maxwell, mayor of Monticello
- Stewart Nelson, mayor of Morrilton
- Steve Northcutt, mayor of Malvern
- Terry Oliver, mayor of Prescott
- Harold Perrin, mayor of Jonesboro
- Johnnie Roebuck, former majority leader of the Arkansas House of Representatives
- Bob Stacy, mayor of Wynne
- Brent Talley, state representative
- Robert F. Thompson, state senator
- Tab Townsell, mayor of Conway
- Kathy Webb, former state representative
- Dane Weindorf, mayor of Hamburg
- Hank Wilkins, state representative
- James Lee Witt, former FEMA director and former county judge of Yell County
- David Wyatt, state senator

Business leaders

- Abraham Carpenter Jr., owner and operator of Carpenter's Produce
- Jim Gaston, owner of Gaston's White River Resort, former Arkansas Business Executive of the Year and emeritus member of the Arkansas Parks & Tourism Commission

Organizations

- Arkansas Professional Fire Fighters Association
- Arkansas Timber Producers Association
- Central South Carpenters Regional Council
- Laborers International Union of North America
- Laborers Local 107
- Laborers Local 1282
- Southern States Millwright Regional Council
- Southwest Laborers District Council

=== Polling ===
Hypothetical polling

Poll source	Date(s) administered	Sample size	Margin of error	Bill Halter	Mike Ross	Undecided
Clark Research	July 23–27, 2013	370	± 5%	26%	40%	34%

=== Results ===
Results by county: Ross: >90%; 80–90%; 70–80%

Democratic primary results
Party	Candidate	Votes	%
Democratic	Mike Ross	129,437	84.41
Democratic	Lynette "Doc" Bryant	23,906	15.59
Total votes		153,343	100.00

== Republican primary ==
=== Candidates ===
==== Nominee ====
- Asa Hutchinson, former administrator of the DEA, former U.S. representative, nominee for U.S. Senate in 1986 and nominee for governor in 2006

==== Eliminated in primary ====
- Curtis Coleman, founder of a food safety company and candidate for the U.S. Senate in 2010

==== Withdrew ====
- Debra Hobbs, state representative (running for lieutenant governor)

==== Declined ====
- Davy Carter, speaker of the Arkansas House of Representatives
- Tom Cotton, U.S. representative for Arkansas's 4th congressional district (2013–2015) (running for the U.S. Senate)
- Rick Crawford, U.S. representative for Arkansas's 1st congressional district (2011–present)
- Mark Darr, former lieutenant governor of Arkansas
- G. David Gearhart, chancellor of the University of Arkansas
- Tim Griffin, U.S. representative for Arkansas's 2nd congressional district (2011–2015) (running for lieutenant governor)
- Missy Irvin, state senator
- Jim Keet, former state senator and nominee for governor in 2010
- Johnny Key, state senator
- Mark Martin, secretary of state of Arkansas (running for re-election)
- Sheffield Nelson, businessman and nominee for governor in 1990 and 1994
- Steve Womack, U.S. representative Arkansas's 3rd congressional district (2011–present)

=== Endorsements ===
Curtis Coleman

National politicians

- Ron Paul, former U.S. representative (R-TX) and candidate for president in 2008 and 2012

Elected legislators

- Randy Alexander, state representative
- John Cooper, state senator
- Joe Farrer, state representative
- John "Hutch" Hutchison, state representative
- John Payton, state representative
- Richard Womack, state representative

Local elected leaders

- Larry E. Burgess, Miller County judge
- Jayme Nicholson, Baxter County assessor
- Wayne Smith, mayor of Texarkana
- Tim Stockdale, Garland County treasurer

Organizations

- Miller County Patriots

Organization leaders

- Bishop Robert E. Smith Sr., founder of Total Outreach for Christ Ministries, Inc. and Word of Outreach Christian Center
- Timothy Stephenson, founder of the EAST Initiative
Asa Hutchinson

Federal legislators

- Rick Crawford, U.S. representative
- Tim Griffin, U.S. representative

State legislators

- Nate Bell, state representative
- Cecile Bledsoe, state senator
- John Burris, state representative
- Ron Caldwell, state senator
- Davy Carter, speaker of the Arkansas House of Representatives
- Alan Clark, state senator from Garland County
- Andy Davis, state representative
- Jonathan Dismang, majority whip of the Arkansas Senate
- Jon Eubanks, state representative
- Bill Gossage, state representative
- Justin Harris, state representative
- Bart Hester, state senator
- Michael Lamoureux, president pro tempore of the Arkansas Senate
- Micah Neal, state representative
- Matthew Shepherd, state representative

Local elected officials

- Jerry Taylor, Democratic former state senator, state representative, and mayor of Pine Bluff

=== Polling ===
Poll source	Date(s) administered	Sample size	Margin of error	Curtis Coleman	Asa Hutchinson	Undecided
Talk Business/Hendrix College	April 29, 2014	1,516	± 2.5%	20%	70%	10%
Public Policy Polling	April 25–27, 2014	342	± 5.3%	23%	62%	15%

=== Results ===
Results by county: Hutchinson: 80–90%; 70–80%; 60–70%; 50–60%; Coleman: 50–60%

Republican primary results
Party	Candidate	Votes	%
Republican	Asa Hutchinson	130,752	72.95
Republican	Curtis Coleman	48,473	27.05
Total votes		179,225	100.00

== Third parties ==
=== Candidates ===
==== Declared ====
- Josh Drake (Green), attorney and nominee for Arkansas's 4th congressional district in 2008, 2010 and 2012
- Frank Gilbert (Libertarian), DeKalb Township constable, former mayor of Tull and nominee for the state senate in 2012

==== Declined ====
- Sheffield Nelson (Independent), businessman and Republican nominee for governor in 1990 and 1994

== General election ==
=== Debates ===
- Complete video of debate, September 19, 2014 - C-SPAN
- Complete video of debate, October 7, 2014 - C-SPAN

=== Predictions ===
Source	Ranking	As of
The Cook Political Report	Lean R (flip)	November 3, 2014
Sabato's Crystal Ball	Likely R (flip)	November 3, 2014
Inside Elections	Lean R (flip)	November 3, 2014
Real Clear Politics	Lean R (flip)	November 3, 2014

=== Polling ===
Poll source	Date(s) administered	Sample size	Margin of error	Mike Ross (D)	Asa Hutchinson (R)	Other	Undecided
Opinion Research Associates	October 30–November 1, 2014	400	± 5%	43%	39%	5%	14%
Public Policy Polling	October 30–November 1, 2014	1,092	± 3%	41%	51%	4%	4%
Public Policy Polling	October 30–November 1, 2014	1,092	± 3%	44%	53%	—	3%
Rasmussen Reports	October 27–29, 2014	967	± 3%	43%	50%	3%	4%
Issues & Answers Network	October 21–27, 2014	568	± 4.1%	39%	50%	—	11%
Opinion Research Associates	October 25–26, 2014	401	± 5%	44%	42%	2%	11%
CBS News/NYT/YouGov	October 16–23, 2014	1,567	± 4%	38%	47%	0%	15%
NBC News/Marist	October 19–23, 2014	621	± 3.9%	44%	47%	4%	5%
NBC News/Marist	October 19–23, 2014	971	± 3.1%	44%	43%	5%	8%
Hendrix Poll	October 15–16, 2014	2,075	± 2.2%	41%	49%	5%	6%
Rasmussen Reports	October 13–15, 2014	940	± 3%	47%	49%	1%	3%
Fox News	October 4–7, 2014	707	± 3.5%	37%	46%	5%	12%
Opinion Research Associates	October 1–5, 2014	400	± 5%	45%	41%	3%	11%
CBS News/NYT/YouGov	September 20–October 1, 2014	1,991	± 2%	38%	49%	1%	12%
Rasmussen Reports	September 24–25, 2014	750	± 4%	42%	46%	4%	8%
Suffolk	September 20–23, 2014	500	± 4.4%	41%	43%	5%	11%
Public Policy Polling	September 18–21, 2014	1,453	± 2.6%	38%	44%	5%	13%
Public Policy Polling	September 18–21, 2014	1,453	± 2.6%	40%	46%	—	14%
Gravis Marketing	September 8–11, 2014	902	± 4%	42%	46%	2%	10%
Answers Unlimited	September 7–9, 2014	600	± 3.5%	44%	44%	4%	8%
CBS News/NYT/YouGov	August 18–September 2, 2014	1,572	± 3%	38%	45%	1%	15%
NBC News/Marist	September 2–4, 2014	639 LV	± 3.9%	39%	48%	6%	7%
NBC News/Marist	September 2–4, 2014	1,068 RV	± 3%	39%	46%	7%	8%
Rasmussen Reports	August 25–26, 2014	750	± 4%	46%	44%	3%	7%
Opinion Research Associates	August 6–14, 2014	414	± 4.9%	44%	44%	3%	9%
Public Policy Polling	August 1–3, 2014	1,066	± 3%	38%	43%	7%	12%
Public Policy Polling	August 1–3, 2014	1,066	± 3%	40%	46%	—	14%
Talk Business/Hendrix College	July 22–25, 2014	1,780	± 2.3%	41%	46%	6%	7.5%
CBS News/NYT/YouGov	July 5–24, 2014	1,616	± 3.5%	45%	48%	2%	4%
Gravis Marketing	July 7–8, 2014	987	± 3%	46%	49%	5%	—
Public Opinion Strategies	May 27–29, 2014	500	± 4.39%	42%	48%	—	10%
Rasmussen Reports	May 27–28, 2014	750	± 4%	41%	48%	4%	6%
NBC News/Marist	April 30–May 4, 2014	876	± 3.3%	42%	49%	2%	7%
Public Policy Polling	April 25–27, 2014	840	± 3.4%	38%	46%	—	16%
New York Times/Kaiser Family	April 8–15, 2014	857	± ?	40%	41%	4%	16%
Opinion Research Associates	April 1–8, 2014	400	± 5%	45%	39%	—	17%
Talk Business/Hendrix College	April 3–4, 2014	1,068	± 3%	44%	43%	5%	8%
Impact Management Group	February 10, 2014	1,202	± 2.83%	42%	42%	—	17%
Rasmussen Reports	February 4–5, 2014	500	± 4.5%	44%	41%	3%	12%
Public Policy Polling	December 13–15, 2013	1,004	± 3.1%	43%	44%	—	14%
Impact Management Group	October 24, 2013	911	± 3.2%	37%	40%	—	23%
University of Arkansas	October 10–17, 2013	800	± 3.5%	30%	32%	—	38%
Talk Business/Hendrix College	October 8, 2013	603	± 4.%	37%	41%	—	22%
Harper Polling	August 4–5, 2013	587	± 4.04%	38%	46%	—	16%
Talk Business/Hendrix College	February 20, 2013	675	± 3.8%	38%	43%	—	19%

Hypothetical polling

Poll source	Date(s) administered	Sample size	Margin of error	Lynette Bryant (D)	Asa Hutchinson (R)	Other	Undecided
Talk Business/Hendrix College	April 3–4, 2014	1,068	± 3%	27.5%	48%	8%	17%

Poll source	Date(s) administered	Sample size	Margin of error	Bill Halter (D)	Asa Hutchinson (R)	Other	Undecided
Talk Business/Hendrix College	February 20, 2013	675	± 3.8%	31%	47%	—	22%

Poll source	Date(s) administered	Sample size	Margin of error	Dustin McDaniel (D)	Asa Hutchinson (R)	Other	Undecided
Public Policy Polling	January 10–13, 2013	600	± 4.0%	33%	46%	—	22%

Poll source	Date(s) administered	Sample size	Margin of error	Mike Ross (D)	Curtis Coleman (R)	Other	Undecided
Public Policy Polling	April 25–27, 2014	840	± 3.4%	43%	33%	—	24%
Talk Business/Hendrix College	April 3–4, 2014	1,068	± 3%	48%	30%	7%	15%

=== Results ===
2014 Arkansas gubernatorial election
Party	Candidate	Votes	%	±%
Republican	Asa Hutchinson	470,429	55.44%	+21.81%
Democratic	Mike Ross	352,115	41.49%	−22.93%
Libertarian	Frank Gilbert	16,319	1.92%	N/A
Green	Josh Drake	9,729	1.15%	−0.71%
Total votes		848,592	100.00%	N/A
Republican gain from Democratic				

==== By county ====
County	Mike Ross Democratic		Asa Hutchinson Republican		Various candidates Other parties		Margin		Total
County	#	%	#	%	#	%	#	%	Total
Arkansas	2,317	45.47%	2,676	52.51%	103	2.02%	359	7.04%	5,096
Ashley	3,077	49.26%	3,037	48.62%	132	2.11%	-40	-0.64%	6,246
Baxter	4,681	31.31%	9,693	64.83%	577	3.86%	5,012	33.52%	14,951
Benton	17,122	27.20%	43,535	69.17%	2,284	3.63%	26,413	41.96%	62,941
Boone	3,107	28.29%	7,363	67.05%	512	4.66%	4,256	38.75%	10,982
Bradley	1,498	51.55%	1,360	46.80%	48	1.65%	-138	-4.75%	2,906
Calhoun	740	44.98%	862	52.40%	43	2.61%	122	7.42%	1,645
Carroll	3,095	38.27%	4,635	57.31%	357	4.41%	1,540	19.04%	8,087
Chicot	2,437	69.57%	1,024	29.23%	42	1.20%	-1,413	-40.34%	3,503
Clark	4,014	57.58%	2,834	40.65%	123	1.76%	-1,180	-16.93%	6,971
Clay	1,912	47.60%	1,943	48.37%	162	4.03%	31	0.77%	4,017
Cleburne	2,797	28.32%	6,670	67.53%	410	4.15%	3,873	39.21%	9,877
Cleveland	1,103	40.33%	1,558	56.97%	74	2.71%	455	16.64%	2,735
Columbia	3,541	44.20%	4,306	53.74%	165	2.06%	765	9.55%	8,012
Conway	2,822	44.41%	3,366	52.97%	167	2.63%	544	8.56%	6,355
Craighead	10,342	40.79%	14,218	56.07%	797	3.14%	3,876	15.29%	25,357
Crawford	4,426	27.28%	11,180	68.90%	621	3.83%	6,754	41.62%	16,227
Crittenden	5,845	55.03%	4,497	42.34%	279	2.63%	-1,348	-12.69%	10,621
Cross	2,240	42.54%	2,899	55.05%	127	2.41%	659	12.51%	5,266
Dallas	1,274	53.37%	1,076	45.08%	37	1.55%	-198	-8.29%	2,387
Desha	2,297	67.38%	1,057	31.01%	55	1.61%	-1,240	-36.37%	3,409
Drew	2,620	49.96%	2,535	48.34%	89	1.70%	-85	-1.62%	5,244
Faulkner	12,227	36.02%	20,540	60.52%	1,174	3.46%	8,313	24.49%	33,941
Franklin	1,859	33.73%	3,488	63.28%	165	2.99%	1,629	29.55%	5,512
Fulton	1,394	41.21%	1,867	55.19%	122	3.61%	473	13.98%	3,383
Garland	12,118	39.20%	17,729	57.35%	1,069	3.46%	5,611	18.15%	30,916
Grant	1,853	34.62%	3,327	62.16%	172	3.21%	1,474	27.54%	5,352
Greene	4,321	38.98%	6,355	57.33%	409	3.69%	2,034	18.35%	11,085
Hempstead	2,637	48.87%	2,662	49.33%	97	1.80%	25	0.46%	5,396
Hot Spring	4,154	44.04%	4,963	52.61%	316	3.35%	809	8.58%	9,433
Howard	1,851	50.31%	1,768	48.06%	60	1.63%	-83	-2.26%	3,679
Independence	3,623	34.02%	6,634	62.30%	392	3.68%	3,011	28.27%	10,649
Izard	1,702	39.08%	2,470	56.72%	183	4.20%	768	17.63%	4,355
Jackson	2,045	49.27%	1,981	47.72%	125	3.01%	-64	-1.54%	4,151
Jefferson	13,447	66.64%	6,473	32.08%	258	1.28%	-6,974	-34.56%	20,178
Johnson	2,572	39.17%	3,742	56.98%	253	3.85%	1,170	17.82%	6,567
Lafayette	1,200	49.63%	1,177	48.68%	41	1.70%	-23	-0.95%	2,418
Lawrence	2,079	45.15%	2,340	50.81%	186	4.04%	261	5.67%	4,605
Lee	1,713	64.71%	898	33.93%	36	1.36%	-815	-30.79%	2,647
Lincoln	1,531	49.60%	1,476	47.81%	80	2.59%	-55	-1.78%	3,087
Little River	2,005	48.90%	2,001	48.80%	94	2.29%	-4	-0.10%	4,100
Logan	2,378	36.56%	3,918	60.24%	208	3.20%	1,540	23.68%	6,504
Lonoke	5,568	28.48%	13,385	68.47%	595	3.04%	7,817	39.99%	19,548
Madison	1,820	35.16%	3,171	61.25%	186	3.59%	1,351	26.10%	5,177
Marion	1,571	31.37%	3,185	63.60%	252	5.03%	1,614	32.23%	5,008
Miller	4,241	36.93%	7,031	61.22%	213	1.85%	2,790	24.29%	11,485
Mississippi	5,526	54.02%	4,321	42.24%	383	3.74%	-1,205	-11.78%	10,230
Monroe	1,309	54.84%	1,026	42.98%	52	2.18%	-283	-11.86%	2,387
Montgomery	1,113	38.05%	1,711	58.50%	101	3.45%	598	20.44%	2,925
Nevada	1,657	59.69%	1,085	39.09%	34	1.22%	-572	-20.61%	2,776
Newton	970	31.99%	1,903	62.76%	159	5.24%	933	30.77%	3,032
Ouachita	4,340	54.80%	3,456	43.64%	124	1.57%	-884	-11.16%	7,920
Perry	1,386	38.53%	2,074	57.66%	137	3.81%	688	19.13%	3,597
Phillips	3,713	64.51%	1,888	32.80%	155	2.69%	-1,825	-31.71%	5,756
Pike	1,302	41.78%	1,746	56.03%	68	2.18%	444	14.25%	3,116
Poinsett	2,730	42.87%	3,423	53.75%	215	3.38%	693	10.88%	6,368
Polk	1,965	30.85%	4,110	64.53%	294	4.62%	2,145	33.68%	6,369
Pope	5,085	29.76%	11,412	66.79%	590	3.45%	6,327	37.03%	17,087
Prairie	1,019	38.32%	1,563	58.78%	77	2.90%	544	20.46%	2,659
Pulaski	71,804	56.23%	53,050	41.55%	2,835	2.22%	-18,754	-14.69%	127,689
Randolph	2,220	43.87%	2,600	51.38%	240	4.74%	380	7.51%	5,060
Saline	12,555	31.60%	25,823	65.00%	1,351	3.40%	13,268	33.40%	39,729
Scott	1,073	34.62%	1,919	61.92%	107	3.45%	846	27.30%	3,099
Searcy	765	24.97%	2,174	70.95%	125	4.08%	1,409	45.99%	3,064
Sebastian	9,971	31.29%	20,875	65.51%	1,018	3.19%	10,904	34.22%	31,864
Sevier	1,549	43.58%	1,908	53.69%	97	2.73%	359	10.10%	3,554
Sharp	2,031	35.75%	3,396	59.78%	254	4.47%	1,365	24.03%	5,681
St. Francis	3,681	61.73%	2,161	36.24%	121	2.03%	-1,520	-25.49%	5,963
Stone	1,516	33.55%	2,809	62.17%	193	4.27%	1,293	28.62%	4,518
Union	5,555	44.71%	6,626	53.33%	243	1.96%	1,071	8.62%	12,424
Van Buren	2,112	35.60%	3,582	60.38%	238	4.01%	1,470	24.78%	5,932
Washington	22,420	41.11%	30,134	55.25%	1,986	3.64%	7,714	14.14%	54,540
White	6,120	27.98%	15,007	68.62%	744	3.40%	8,887	40.63%	21,871
Woodruff	1,342	62.53%	757	35.27%	47	2.19%	-585	-27.26%	2,146
Yell	2,070	39.62%	2,985	57.13%	170	3.25%	915	17.51%	5,225
Totals	352,115	41.49%	470,429	55.44%	26,048	3.07%	118,314	13.94%	848,592

Counties that flipped from Democratic to Republican

- Arkansas (largest city: Stuttgart)
- Baxter (largest city: Mountain Home)
- Benton (largest city: Rogers)
- Boone (largest city: Harrison)
- Calhoun (largest city: Hampton)
- Carroll (largest city: Berryville)
- Clay (largest city: Piggott)
- Cleburne (largest city: Heber Springs)
- Cleveland (largest city: Rison)
- Columbia (largest city: Magnolia)
- Conway (largest city: Morrilton)
- Craighead (largest city: Jonesboro)
- Crawford (largest city: Van Buren)
- Cross (largest city: Wynne)
- Faulkner (largest city: Conway)
- Franklin (largest city: Ozark)
- Fulton (largest city: Salem)
- Garland (largest city: Hot Springs)
- Grant (largest city: Sheridan)
- Greene (largest city: Paragould)
- Hempstead (largest city: Hope)
- Hot Spring (largest city: Malvern)
- Independence (largest city: Batesville)
- Izard (largest city: Horseshoe Bend)
- Johnson (largest city: Clarksville)
- Lawrence (largest city: Walnut Ridge)
- Logan (largest city: Booneville)
- Lonoke (largest city: Cabot)
- Madison (largest city: Huntsville)
- Marion (largest city: Bull Shoals)
- Miller (largest city: Texarkana)
- Montgomery (largest city: Mount Ida)
- Newton (largest city: Jasper)
- Perry (largest city: Perryville)
- Pike (largest city: Glenwood)
- Poinsett (largest city: Harrisburg)
- Polk (largest city: Mena)
- Pope (largest city: Russellville)
- Prairie (largest city: Des Arc)
- Randolph (largest city: Pocahontas)
- Saline (largest city: Benton)
- Scott (largest city: Waldron)
- Searcy (largest city: Marshall)
- Sebastian (largest city: Fort Smith)
- Sevier (largest city: De Queen)
- Sharp (largest city: Cherokee Village)
- Stone (largest city: Mountain View)
- Union (largest city: El Dorado)
- Van Buren (largest city: Clinton)
- Washington (largest city: Fayetteville)
- White (largest city: Searcy)
- Yell (largest city: Dardanelle)

==== By congressional district ====
Hutchinson won all four congressional districts.

District	Ross	Hutchinson	Representative
1st	43%	54%	Rick Crawford
2nd	46%	52%	French Hill
3rd	33%	64%	Steve Womack
4th	44%	53%	Bruce Westerman
