= 2006 Arkansas lieutenant gubernatorial election =

- November 7, 2006
- Turnout: 47.22%
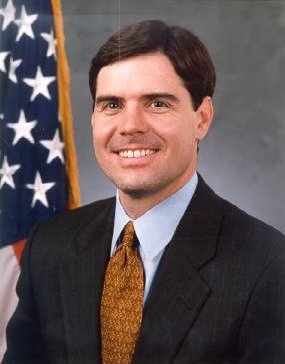

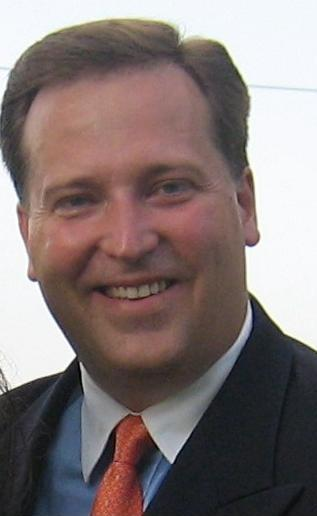
Nominee	Bill Halter	Jim Holt
Party	Democratic	Republican
Popular vote	437,490	325,215
Percentage	57.36%	42.64%
- County results Halter: 50–60% 60–70% 70–80% Holt: 50–60%
Lieutenant Governor before election
Vacant
Elected Lieutenant Governor
Bill Halter
Democratic

The 2006 Arkansas lieutenant gubernatorial election was held on November 7, 2006, to elect the Lieutenant Governor of Arkansas, concurrently with elections to the United States House of Representatives, governor, and other state and local elections. Primary elections were held on May 23, 2006, with primary runoff elections, if necessary, being held on June 13, 2006.

Incumbent Republican lieutenant governor Winthrop Paul Rockefeller, who was term-limited from seeking a third full term in office, died on July 16, 2006, due to complications from myeloproliferative disorder. The office then remained vacant until January 2007.

Former Social Security Administration commissioner Bill Halter, who had previously considered a run for governor, defeated state legislator Jim Holt in the general election, flipping party control of the office. As of 2026, this election is the last time a Democrat was elected to the office of lieutenant governor.

== Republican primary ==
=== Candidates ===
==== Nominee ====
- Jim Holt, state senator from the 35th district (2003–present) and state representative from the 5th district (2001–2003)

==== Eliminated in primary ====
- Charles Banks
- Doug Matayo, state representative from the 93rd district (2003–present)

=== Polling ===
Poll source	Date(s) administered	Sample size (Note: Key: A – all adults RV – registered voters LV – likely voters V – unclear)	Margin of error	Charles Banks	Jim Holt	Doug Matayo	Undecided
SurveyUSA/KTHV	May 12–14, 2006	344 (LV)	± 5.3%	12%	57%	12%	19%
SurveyUSA/KTHV	April 8–10, 2006	353 (LV)	± 5.2%	12%	59%	7%	22%

=== Results ===
Republican primary results
Party	Candidate	Votes	%
Republican	Jim Holt	35,309	56.16
Republican	Charles Banks	15,722	25.01
Republican	Doug Matayo	11,837	18.83
Total votes		62,868	100.0

== Democratic primary ==
=== Candidates ===
==== Nominee ====
- Bill Halter, former acting commissioner of the Social Security Administration (2001)

==== Eliminated in primary runoff ====
- Tim Wooldridge, state senator and former state representative

==== Eliminated in primary ====
- Mike Hathorn, former state representative from the 90th district (2003–2005) and 24th district (1999–2003)
- Jay Martin, majority leader of the Arkansas House of Representatives (2005–present) from the 40th district (2003–present)

=== Polling ===
==== Regular primary ====
Poll source	Date(s) administered	Sample size	Margin of error	Bill Halter	Mike Hathorn	Jay Martin	Tim Wooldridge	Undecided
SurveyUSA/KTHV	May 12–14, 2006	491 (LV)	± 4.5%	41%	14%	6%	20%	20%
SurveyUSA/KTHV	April 8–10, 2006	446 (LV)	± 4.7%	33%	14%	7%	15%	31%

==== Runoff ====
Poll source	Date(s) administered	Sample size	Margin of error	Bill Halter	Tim Wooldridge	Other/Undecided
SurveyUSA/KTHV	June 9–11, 2006	455 (LV)	± 4.7%	60%	35%	6%
SurveyUSA/KTHV	June 3–5, 2006	436 (LV)	± 4.8%	59%	34%	7%

=== Results ===
Democratic primary results
Party	Candidate	Votes	%
Democratic	Bill Halter	110,797	39.97
Democratic	Tim Wooldridge	73,718	26.59
Democratic	Mike Hathorn	68,531	24.72
Democratic	Jay Martin	24,174	8.72
Total votes		277,220	100.0
Runoff election
Democratic	Bill Halter	97,279	56.50
Democratic	Tim Wooldridge	74,906	43.50
Total votes		172,185	100.0

== General election ==
=== Polling ===
Poll source	Date(s) administered	Sample size	Margin of error	Jim Holt (R)	Bill Halter (D)	Other/Undecided
SurveyUSA/KTHV	November 3–5, 2006	549 (LV)	± 4.3%	42%	50%	7%
SurveyUSA/KTHV	October 22–24, 2006	572 (LV)	± 4.2%	39%	54%	7%
SurveyUSA/KTHV	September 25–26, 2006	493 (LV)	± 4.5%	42%	48%	10%
SurveyUSA/KTHV	August 27–29, 2006	538 (LV)	± 4.3%	41%	50%	8%
SurveyUSA/KTHV	July 14–16, 2006	509 (LV)	± 4.4%	39%	48%	12%

=== Results ===
2006 Arkansas lieutenant gubernatorial election
Party	Candidate	Votes	%
Democratic	Bill Halter	437,490	57.36
Republican	Jim Holt	325,515	42.64
Total votes		763,005	100.0
Democratic gain from Republican			
