= 2010 United States Senate election in Arkansas =

- November 2, 2010
- Turnout: 47.61%
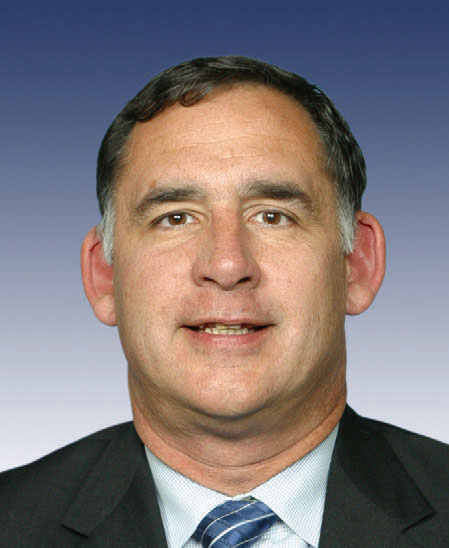

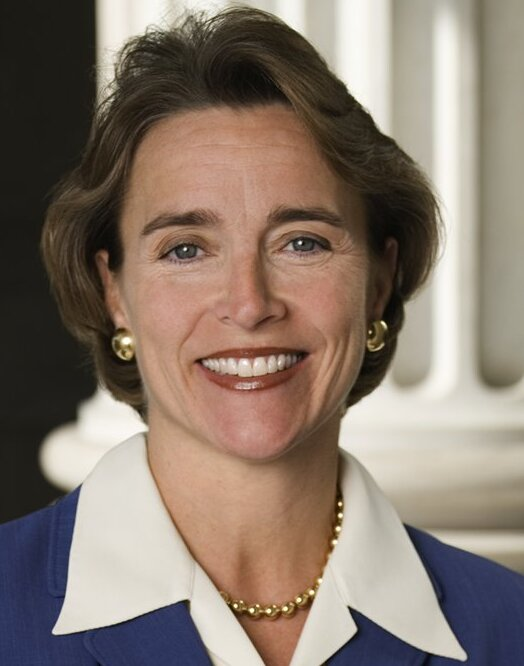
Nominee	John Boozman	Blanche Lincoln
Party	Republican	Democratic
Popular vote	451,617	288,156
Percentage	57.90%	36.95%
- Boozman: 40–50% 50–60% 60–70% 70–80% Lincoln: 40–50% 50–60% 60–70%
U.S. senator before election
Blanche Lincoln
Democratic
Elected U.S. Senator
John Boozman
Republican

The 2010 United States Senate election in Arkansas took place on November 2, 2010, alongside other elections to the United States Senate in other states, as well as elections to the United States House of Representatives and various state and local elections.

This was one of the three Democratic-held Senate seats up for election in a state that John McCain won in the 2008 presidential election along with North Dakota and West Virginia. Incumbent Democratic Senator Blanche Lincoln ran for re-election to a third term, facing a strong primary challenge from Lieutenant Governor Bill Halter and prevailing only in a runoff. Lincoln then lost the general election to U.S. Representative John Boozman, the younger brother of Fay Boozman, whom Lincoln defeated in 1998. Boozman became the first Republican since Reconstruction in 1872 to win this seat. Lincoln's 21% margin of defeat was the largest for a sitting senator since the 1978 United States Senate election in Maine. With Democratic Governor Mike Beebe concurrently winning re-election, this is the last time that Arkansas simultaneously voted for gubernatorial and U.S. Senate candidates of different political parties.

== Democratic primary ==
The Democratic primary was held on May 18, 2010, with early voting from May 3 to 17. Lincoln was challenged by Lieutenant Governor Bill Halter, who ran as a more liberal alternative. As no candidate received 50 percent of the vote, a runoff election was held on June 8, with early voting from June 1 to 7. Lincoln managed to narrowly defeat Halter in the runoff.

MoveOn.org supported Halter, criticizing Lincoln for her stance on issues such as health care and environmental regulations. Labor unions also backed Halter, and pledged to spend more than $3 million on his campaign.

=== Candidates ===
==== Nominee ====
- Blanche Lincoln, incumbent U.S. senator

==== Eliminated in runoff ====
- Bill Halter, incumbent lieutenant governor of Arkansas

==== Eliminated in primary ====
- D.C. Morrison, businessman

==== Withdrew before primary ====
- Drew Pritt, activist and 2006 candidate for lieutenant governor of Arkansas

=== Polling ===
Poll source	Date(s) administered	Sample size	Margin of error	Blanche Lincoln	Bill Halter	D.C. Morrison	Other	Undecided
Research 2000	May 10–12, 2010	600	± 5%	46%	37%	6%	—	11%
Research 2000	April 26–28, 2010	600	± 5%	43%	35%	—	7% (Drew Pritt)	15%
Talk Business	April 13, 2010	1,167	± 3%	38%	31%	10%	—	20%
Research 2000	March 22–24, 2010	600	± 4%	44%	31%	—	—	25%
Research 2000	November 30 – December 2, 2009	600	± 4%	42%	26%	—	—	32%

=== Results ===
Results by county: Lincoln: 40–50%; 50–60%; 60–70%; Halter: 40–50%; 50–60%; 60–70%

Democratic primary results
Party	Candidate	Votes	%
Democratic	Blanche Lincoln (incumbent)	146,579	44.51%
Democratic	Bill Halter	140,081	42.53%
Democratic	D.C. Morrison	42,695	12.96%
Total votes		329,355	100.00%

=== Runoff ===
==== Polling ====
Poll source	Date(s) administered	Sample size	Margin of error	Blanche Lincoln	Bill Halter	Undecided
Research 2000	June 2–4, 2010	600	± 4%	45%	49%	6%
Research 2000	May 24–26, 2010	600	± 4%	44%	47%	9%

==== Results ====
Runoff results by county: Lincoln: 50–60%; 60–70%; 70–80%; Halter: 50–60%; 60–70%; 70–80%

Democratic primary runoff results
Party	Candidate	Votes	%
Democratic	Blanche Lincoln (incumbent)	134,756	52.00%
Democratic	Bill Halter	124,405	48.00%
Total votes		259,161	100.00%

== Republican primary ==
The Republican primary was held on May 18, 2010, with early voting from May 3–17.

=== Candidates ===
==== Nominee ====
- John Boozman, optometrist and U.S. representative for Arkansas's 3rd congressional district

==== Eliminated in primary ====
- Randy Alexander, University of Arkansas housing director and vice chair of the Washington County Tea Party
- Gilbert Baker, state senator
- Curtis Coleman, businessman
- Kim Hendren, minority leader of the Arkansas Senate
- Jim Holt, former state senator, nominee for this U.S. Senate seat in 2004, and nominee for lieutenant governor of Arkansas in 2006
- Fred Ramey, real estate investment company owner
- Conrad Reynolds, retired U.S. Army colonel

=== Straw poll ===
In December 2009, a straw poll was held for the current Republican candidates for U.S. Senate. The results were as follows:

1. Gilbert Baker – 35%
2. Curtis Coleman – 33%
3. Conrad Reynolds – 23%
4. Tom Cox – 4%
5. Kim Hendren – 2%
6. Fred Ramey – 2%
7. Buddy Rogers – 1%

=== Polling ===
Poll source	Date(s) administered	Sample size	Margin of error	Randy Alexander	Gilbert Baker	John Boozman	Curtis Coleman	Kim Hendren	Jim Holt	Fred Ramey	Conrad Reynolds	Other	Undecided
Research 2000	May 10–12, 2010	–	± 4%	—	12%	46%	—	6%	19%	—	—	4%	13%
Talk Business	April 13, 2010	1,357	± 3%	3%	14%	46%	5%	3%	8%	1%	3%	—	17%

=== Results ===
Results by county: Boozman: 20–30%; 30–40%; 40–50%; 50–60%; 60–70%; 80–90%; Holt: 30–40%; 40–50%; Boozman/Holt tie: 20–30%; Baker: 30–40%; 50–60%

Republican primary results
Party	Candidate	Votes	%
Republican	John Boozman	75,010	52.73%
Republican	Jim Holt	24,826	17.45%
Republican	Gilbert Baker	16,540	11.63%
Republican	Conrad Reynolds	7,128	5.01%
Republican	Curtis Coleman	6,928	4.87%
Republican	Kim Hendren	5,551	3.90%
Republican	Randy Alexander	4,389	3.09%
Republican	Fred Ramey	1,888	1.33%
Total votes		142,260	100.00%

== General election ==
=== Candidates ===
- John Boozman, U.S. representative
- Trevor Drown (L), military veteran
- John Gray (G), mayor of Greenland
- Blanche Lincoln, incumbent senator

=== Campaign ===
Arkansas had previously only elected one Republican senator since the Reconstruction, Tim Hutchinson who was defeated after his first term in 2002 by Mark Pryor. Lincoln faced Lieutenant Governor Bill Halter and narrowly won the primary contest.

The political blog FiveThirtyEight ranked Lincoln the most vulnerable senator of this electoral cycle. RealClearPolitics claimed that in 2010 Lincoln had the potential for the lowest percentage of the vote for any incumbent since the nation first began directly electing senators. Boozman received 58% of the vote in the general election and defeated Lincoln (37%), Independent Trevor Drown (3%) and Green John Gray (2%).

Lincoln heavily criticized Boozman for supporting the FairTax and privatization of Social Security, as well as for trying to tie her name, and beliefs to Bill Clinton. She released an advertisement touting her support for earmarks.

=== Debates ===
2010 United States Senate general election in Arkansas debate
No.	Date	Link	Democratic	Republican
P Participant A Absent N Non-invitee I Invitee W Withdrawn				
P Participant A Absent N Non-invitee I Invitee W Withdrawn			Blanche Lincoln	John Boozman
1	October 13, 2010	C-SPAN|C-SPAN	P	P

=== Predictions ===
Source	Ranking	As of
Cook Political Report	Lean R (flip)	October 9, 2010
Inside Elections	Likely R (flip)	October 8, 2010
Sabato's Crystal Ball	Safe R (flip)	October 28, 2010
RealClearPolitics	Safe R (flip)	October 9, 2010
CQ Politics	Lean R (flip)	October 9, 2010

=== Fundraising ===
Candidate (Party)	Receipts	Disbursements	Cash on hand	Debt
Blanche Lincoln (D)	$9,508,007	$8,431,989	$1,886,132	$0
John Boozman (R)	$1,452,241	$968,318	$483,923	$11,905
Source: Federal Election Commission

=== Polling ===
Poll source	Date(s) administered	Sample size	Margin of error	Blanche Lincoln (D)	John Boozman (R)	Other	Undecided
Rasmussen Reports	October 28, 2010	500	± 4.5%	36%	55%	5%	4%
CNN/Time/Opinion Research	October 15–19, 2010	1,505	± 2.5%	41%	55%	—	—
Mason-Dixon	October 15–19, 2010	625	± 4%	34%	55%	6%	5%
Talk Business	October 14, 2010	1,953	± 2.2%	36%	49%	8%	7%
Rasmussen Reports	September 30, 2010	500	± 4.5%	37%	55%	3%	5%
Reuters/Ipsos	September 17–19, 2010	600	± 4%	39%	53%	1%	7%
Mason-Dixon	September 12–14, 2010	625	± 4%	34%	51%	4%	11%
Rasmussen Reports	August 18, 2010	500	± 4.5%	27%	65%	4%	3%
Rasmussen Reports	July 20, 2010	500	± 4.5%	35%	60%	2%	3%
Reuters/Ipsos	July 16–18, 2010	600	± 4%	35%	54%	1%	10%
Talk Business	July 17, 2010	793	± 3.7%	32%	57%	5%	6%
Magellan Strategies	July 12, 2010	879	± 3.3%	29%	60%	4%	6%
Rasmussen Reports	June 15, 2010	500	± 4.5%	32%	61%	4%	3%
Research 2000	May 24–26, 2010	600	± 4%	38%	58%	—	4%
Rasmussen Reports	May 19, 2010	500	± 4.5%	28%	66%	2%	4%
Research 2000	May 10–12, 2010	—	± 4%	40%	54%	—	—
Research 2000	April 26–28, 2010	600	± 5%	42%	52%	—	—
Rasmussen Reports	April 26, 2010	500	± 4.5%	30%	57%	9%	5%
Rasmussen Reports	March 30, 2010	500	± 4.5%	36%	51%	6%	7%
Research 2000	March 22–24, 2010	600	± 4%	42%	49%	—	9%
Rasmussen Reports	March 1, 2010	500	± 4.5%	39%	48%	6%	7%
Rasmussen Reports	February 1, 2010	500	± 4.5%	35%	54%	4%	7%
Public Policy Polling	January 29–31, 2010	810	± 3.4%	33%	56%	—	11%

Hypothetical polling

Poll Source	Date(s) administered	Sample size	Margin of error	Blanche Lincoln (D)	Gilbert Baker (R)	Other	Undecided
Public Policy Polling (report)	March 20–22, 2009	600	± 4%	48%	37%	—	16%
Public Policy Polling (report)	August 21–24, 2009	784	± 3.5%	40%	42%	—	18%
Research 2000 (report)	September 8–10, 2009	600	± 4%	44%	37%	—	19%
Rasmussen Reports (report)	September 28, 2009	500	± 4.5%	39%	47%	5%	8%
Zogby (report)	November 16–17, 2009	501	± 4.5%	41%	39%	2%	18%
Rasmussen Reports (report)	December 1, 2009	500	± 4.5%	41%	47%	6%	7%
Research 2000 (report)	November 30 – December 2, 2009	—	± 4%	42%	41%	—	—
Rasmussen Reports (report)	January 5, 2010	500	± 4.5%	39%	51%	3%	7%
Public Policy Polling (report)	January 29–31, 2010	810	± 3.4%	35%	50%	—	15%
Rasmussen Reports (report)	February 1, 2010	500	± 4.5%	33%	52%	6%	8%
Rasmussen Reports (report)	March 1, 2010	500	± 4.5%	40%	45%	6%	8%
Research 2000 (report)	March 22–24, 2010	600	± 4%	41%	49%	—	10%
Rasmussen Reports (report)	March 30, 2010	500	± 4.5%	36%	51%	6%	7%
Rasmussen Reports (report)	April 26, 2010	500	± 4.5%	31%	53%	12%	4%
Research 2000 (report)	April 26–28, 2010	600	± 5%	40%	47%	—	—
Research 2000 (report)	May 10–12, 2010	—	± 4%	39%	45%	—	—

Poll Source	Date(s) administered	Sample size	Margin of error	Blanche Lincoln (D)	Kim Hendren (R)	Other	Undecided
Research 2000 (report)	September 8–10, 2009	600	± 4%	47%	28%	—	25%
Rasmussen Reports (report)	September 28, 2009	500	± 4.5%	41%	44%	5%	10%
Zogby (report)	November 16–17, 2009	501	± 4.5%	45%	29%	2%	24%
Rasmussen Reports (report)	December 1, 2009	500	± 4.5%	39%	46%	6%	9%
Research 2000 (report)	November 30 – December 2, 2009	—	± 4%	46%	30%	—	—
Rasmussen Reports (report)	January 5, 2010	500	± 4.5%	39%	47%	4%	10%
Rasmussen Reports (report)	February 1, 2010	500	± 4.5%	35%	51%	7%	7%
Rasmussen Reports (report)	March 1, 2010	500	± 4.5%	38%	43%	7%	12%
Research 2000 (report)	March 22–24, 2010	600	± 4%	43%	48%	—	9%
Rasmussen Reports (report)	March 30, 2010	500	± 4.5%	35%	51%	5%	8%
Rasmussen Reports (report)	April 26, 2010	500	± 4.5%	30%	51%	11%	8%
Research 2000 (report)	April 26–28, 2010	600	± 5%	40%	50%	—	—
Research 2000 (report)	May 10–12, 2010	—	± 4%	40%	46%	—	—

Poll Source	Date(s) administered	Sample size	Margin of error	Blanche Lincoln (D)	Curtis Coleman (R)	Other	Undecided
Public Policy Polling (report)	August 21–24, 2009	784	± 3.5%	40%	41%	—	19%
Research 2000 (report)	September 8–10, 2009	600	± 4%	45%	37%	—	18%
Rasmussen Reports (report)	September 28, 2009	500	± 4.5%	41%	43%	5%	11%
Rasmussen Reports (report)	December 1, 2009	500	± 4.5%	40%	44%	7%	9%
Research 2000 (report)	November 30 – December 2, 2009	—	± 4%	44%	39%	—	—
Rasmussen Reports (report)	January 5, 2010	500	± 4.5%	38%	48%	4%	9%
Rasmussen Reports (report)	February 1, 2010	500	± 4.5%	34%	50%	7%	9%
Rasmussen Reports (report)	March 1, 2010	500	± 4.5%	41%	43%	7%	10%
Research 2000 (report)	March 22–24, 2010	600	± 4%	44%	47%	—	9%
Rasmussen Reports (report)	March 30, 2010	500	± 4.5%	36%	48%	7%	8%
Rasmussen Reports (report)	April 26, 2010	500	± 4.5%	32%	52%	8%	7%
Research 2000 (report)	April 26–28, 2010	600	± 5%	42%	46%	—	—

Poll Source	Date(s) administered	Sample size	Margin of error	Blanche Lincoln (D)	Jim Holt (R)	Other	Undecided
Rasmussen Reports (report)	March 1, 2010	500	± 4.5%	38%	45%	6%	10%
Rasmussen Reports (report)	March 30, 2010	500	± 4.5%	35%	51%	7%	7%
Rasmussen Reports (report)	April 26, 2010	500	± 4.5%	31%	54%	6%	9%
Research 2000 (report)	May 10–12, 2010	—	± 4%	41%	44%	—	—

with Bill Halter

Poll Source	Date(s) administered	Sample size	Margin of error	Bill Halter (D)	John Boozman (R)	Other	Undecided
Rasmussen Reports (report)	March 1, 2010	500	± 4.5%	33%	52%	6%	9%
Research 2000 (report)	March 22–24, 2010	600	± 4%	40%	48%	—	12%
Rasmussen Reports (report)	March 30, 2010	500	± 4.5%	34%	48%	8%	11%
Rasmussen Reports (report)	April 26, 2010	500	± 4.5%	31%	56%	7%	7%
Research 2000 (report)	April 26–28, 2010	600	± 5%	42%	47%	—	—
Research 2000 (report)	May 10–12, 2010	—	± 4%	41%	50%	—	—

Poll Source	Date(s) administered	Sample size	Margin of error	Bill Halter (D)	Gilbert Baker (R)	Other	Undecided
Rasmussen Reports (report)	March 1, 2010	500	± 4.5%	37%	44%	5%	13%
Research 2000 (report)	March 22–24, 2010	600	± 4%	44%	46%	—	10%
Rasmussen Reports (report)	March 30, 2010	500	± 4.5%	36%	44%	7%	12%
Rasmussen Reports (report)	April 26, 2010	500	± 4.5%	33%	48%	10%	9%
Research 2000 (report)	April 26–28, 2010	600	± 5%	43%	44%	—	—
Research 2000 (report)	May 10–12, 2010	—	± 4%	42%	42%	—	—

Poll Source	Date(s) administered	Sample size	Margin of error	Bill Halter (D)	Kim Hendren (R)	Other	Undecided
Rasmussen Reports (report)	March 1, 2010	500	± 4.5%	35%	42%	7%	15%
Research 2000 (report)	March 22–24, 2010	600	± 4%	44%	45%	—	11%
Rasmussen Reports (report)	March 30, 2010	500	± 4.5%	34%	42%	10%	13%
Rasmussen Reports (report)	April 26, 2010	500	± 4.5%	33%	45%	15%	9%
Research 2000 (report)	April 26–28, 2010	600	± 5%	43%	45%	—	—
Research 2000 (report)	May 10–12, 2010	—	± 4%	42%	42%	—	—

Poll Source	Date(s) administered	Sample size	Margin of error	Bill Halter (D)	Curtis Coleman (R)	Other	Undecided
Rasmussen Reports (report)	March 1, 2010	500	± 4.5%	35%	38%	9%	18%
Research 2000 (report)	March 22–24, 2010	600	± 4%	45%	44%	—	11%
Rasmussen Reports (report)	March 30, 2010	500	± 4.5%	37%	40%	10%	13%
Rasmussen Reports (report)	April 26, 2010	500	± 4.5%	37%	43%	11%	9%
Research 2000 (report)	April 26–28, 2010	600	± 5%	43%	41%	—	—

Poll Source	Date(s) administered	Sample size	Margin of error	Bill Halter (D)	Jim Holt (R)	Other	Undecided
Rasmussen Reports (report)	March 1, 2010	500	± 4.5%	38%	42%	8%	12%
Rasmussen Reports (report)	March 30, 2010	500	± 4.5%	34%	43%	9%	13%
Rasmussen Reports (report)	April 26, 2010	500	± 4.5%	31%	49%	12%	8%
Research 2000 (report)	May 10–12, 2010	—	± 4%	42%	43%	—	—

=== Results ===
United States Senate election in Arkansas, 2010
Party	Candidate	Votes	%	±%
Republican	John Boozman	451,618	57.90%	+13.83%
Democratic	Blanche Lincoln (incumbent)	288,156	36.95%	−18.95%
Libertarian	Trevor Drown	25,234	3.24%	+3.24%
Green	John Gray	14,430	1.85%	+1.85%
Write-in		519	0.07%	+0.04%
Total votes		779,957	100.00%	N/A
Republican gain from Democratic				

==== Counties that flipped from Democratic to Republican ====
- Bradley (largest city: Warren)
- Calhoun (largest city: Hampton)
- Cleveland (largest city: Rison)
- Columbia (largest city: Magnolia)
- Conway (largest city: Morrilton)
- Faulkner (largest city: Conway)
- Franklin (largest city: Ozark)
- Fulton (largest city: Salem)
- Garland (largest city: Hot Springs)
- Grant (largest city: Sheridan)
- Howard (largest city: Nashville)
- Independence (largest city: Batesville)
- Johnson (largest city: Clarksville)
- Logan (largest city: Booneville)
- Miller (largest city: Texarkana)
- Perry (largest city: Perryville)
- Prairie (largest city: Des Arc)
- Sevier (largest city: De Queen)
- Sharp (largest city: Cherokee Village)
- Union (largest city: El Dorado)
- Van Buren (largest city: Clinton)
- Washington (largest city: Fayetteville)
- Yell (largest city: Dardanelle)
- Ashley (largest city: Crossett)
- Craighead (largest city: Jonesboro)
- Cross (largest city: Wynne)
- Dallas (largest city: Fordyce)
- Drew (largest city: Monticello)
- Greene (largest city: Paragould)
- Hot Spring (largest city: Malvern)
- Izard (largest city: Horseshoe Bend)
- Lafayette (largest city: Stamps)
- Nevada (largest city: Prescott)
- Ouachita (largest city: Camden)
- Bradley (largest city: Warren)
- Clay (largest city: Piggott)
- Hempstead (largest city: Hope)
- Little River (largest city: Ashdown)
- Poinsett (largest city: Harrisburg)

== See also ==
- 2010 Arkansas elections
- 2010 United States House of Representatives elections in Arkansas
- 2010 Arkansas gubernatorial election
