= Tim Wooldridge =

American politician

Member of the Arkansas Senate
- In office January 11, 1999 – January 8, 2007
- Preceded by: Mike Todd
- Succeeded by: Robert F. Thompson
- Constituency: 11th district (2003–2007); 30th district (1999–2003)

Member of the Arkansas House of Representatives from the 85th district
- In office January 14, 1991 – January 11, 1999
- Preceded by: Mike Todd
- Succeeded by: Gary Biggs

Personal details
- Born: May 5, 1960 (age 66) Paragould, Arkansas
- Party: Democratic
- Spouse: Lisa Woodson
- Children: 2 (Jeremy, Tiffany)
- Education: Arkansas State University (B.A.)
- Occupation: Development director

Tim Wooldridge (born May 5, 1960) is a Democratic politician from Arkansas who served as a member of the Arkansas Senate from 1999 to 2007 and as a member of the Arkansas House of Representatives from the 85th district from 1991 to 1999.

== Early career ==
Wooldridge was born in Paragould, Arkansas, in 1960. He graduated from Greene County Tech High School in 1978, and then attended Arkansas State University, graduating with his bachelor's degree in communications in 1983. Wooldridge began working for Crowley's Ridge College as an admissions advisor in 1983, and became the vice president of institutional advancement in 1988. He was elected to the Paragould City Council, where he served from 1985 to 1990.

== Arkansas Legislature ==
In 1990, when State Representative Mike Todd opted to run for the State Senate rather than seek re-election, Wooldridge ran to succeed him in the 20th district, which was based in Greene County. He won the Democratic primary over former teacher Nikki Lawson and attorney Dan Stidham, and faced no opposition in the general election. Wooldridge was re-elected in 1992, 1994, and 1996.

Wooldridge announced that he would challenge State Senator Mike Todd for re-election in 1998, However, Todd ultimately declined to seek re-election, He faced no opposition in the Democratic primary or general election and won the seat unopposed. In 2002, following redistricting, Wooldridge ran for re-election in the 11th district, and was re-elected unopposed.

== 2006 lieutenant gubernatorial campaign ==
In 2005, Wooldridge announced that he would run for Lieutenant Governor in the 2006 election. In the Democratic primary, he faced Bill Halter, the former acting Commissioner of the Social Security Administration; State Representative Mike Hathorn; and State House Majority Leader Jay Martin. Wooldridge placed second in the primary to Halter, and the two advanced to a runoff election. Halter ultimately defeated Wooldridge, winning 56 percent of the vote to Wooldridge's 44 percent.

== 2010 congressional campaign ==
Following the retirement of Democratic Congressman Marion Berry, Wooldridge ran to succeed him in the 1st district, which was based in northeastern Arkansas. He faced Chad Causey, Berry's chief of staff, in the Democratic primary. Wooldridge placed first in the primary, receiving 39 percent of the vote to Causey's 27 percent, and in the runoff election, Causey narrowly defeated Wooldridge, winning 53 percent of the vote to his 47 percent.
