= Bill Halter =

American politician

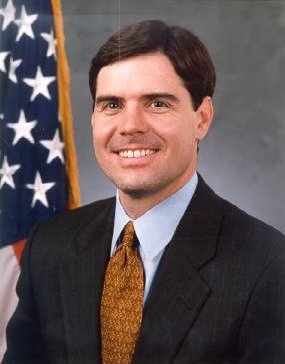

18th Lieutenant Governor of Arkansas
- In office January 9, 2007 – January 11, 2011
- Governor: Mike Beebe
- Preceded by: Winthrop Paul Rockefeller (2006)
- Succeeded by: Mark Darr

Commissioner of the Social Security Administration
- Acting; January 21, 2001 – March 28, 2001
- President: George W. Bush
- Preceded by: Ken Apfel
- Succeeded by: Larry Massanari (acting)

Personal details
- Born: William Amos Halter Jr. November 30, 1960 (age 65) North Little Rock, Arkansas, U.S.
- Party: Democratic
- Education: Stanford University (BA); St John's College, Oxford (MPhil)

William Amos Halter Jr. (born November 30, 1960) is an American politician and businessman who served as the 18th lieutenant governor of Arkansas from 2007 to 2011. A member of the Democratic Party, he was elected to succeed the late Republican Winthrop Paul Rockefeller in 2006, defeating Republican challenger Jim Holt.

Before his election as lieutenant governor, Halter served as the Deputy Commissioner (1999–2001) and Acting Commissioner (2001) of the Social Security Administration (SSA). He previously worked as a senior adviser in the Office of Management and Budget from 1993 to 1999. A native of North Little Rock, he is a graduate of Stanford University and Oxford University.

He unsuccessfully challenged two-term incumbent Blanche Lincoln for the Democratic nomination for the U.S. Senate, losing in the June 8, 2010, runoff after neither candidate won a majority in the May primary. Lincoln subsequently lost the general election to Republican John Boozman. Halter entered the Democratic race for Governor of Arkansas in 2014 but withdrew in July 2013, saying that he wanted to avoid a divisive primary after former U.S. Representative Mike Ross entered the contest.

== Early life and career ==
A fourth-generation Arkansan, Halter was born and raised in North Little Rock, the son of Nancy Jane (née Younts), a nurse, and William Halter Sr., a businessman. He graduated from Little Rock Catholic High School as valedictorian of his class in 1979.

A National Merit Scholar and a 1981 Harry S. Truman Scholar, he studied economics and political science at Stanford University in Palo Alto, California, where he earned a Bachelor of Arts with honors and distinction in 1983. He was a member of Phi Beta Kappa. Upon graduation from Stanford, he won a Rhodes Scholarship to Oxford University in England, where he received a Master of Philosophy degree in economics in 1986. Following his return to the United States, he became a management consultant with McKinsey & Company, working there from 1986 to 1989.

== Public service ==
Halter entered the public sector, serving as an economist to the U.S. Congress Joint Economic Committee and as chief economist for the U.S. Senate Committee on Finance. Following the election of fellow Arkansan Bill Clinton as president of the United States, Halter joined the new administration as a senior adviser in the Office of Management and Budget (OMB) in 1993. He advised on a range of policy issues, reviewed and evaluated budgets and management practices of federal cabinet departments, presented budget options to the president, and helped formulate administration positions on domestic and international policy issues. He also coordinated the work of the President's Management Council, a group consisting of senior management officials from federal departments and agencies.

On October 1, 1999, Halter was nominated by President Clinton to serve as Deputy Commissioner of the Social Security Administration. The Senate Finance Committee held a nomination hearing later that month and favorably reported the nomination on November 8; the Senate confirmed him on November 10. Halter became the first Senate-confirmed Deputy Commissioner after the SSA became an independent agency. As the agency's chief operating officer, he shared executive leadership responsibility for about 65,000 employees in approximately 1,500 offices while the agency delivered more than $500 billion in annual benefits to over 48 million people.

During his tenure, Halter encouraged the use of computer technology in SSA operations, with particular emphasis on the Internet as an informational and service-delivery tool. In November 2000, the agency announced an online retirement-benefit application and an expansion of telephone claims processing as part of its electronic-service efforts. From January 21 to March 28, 2001, Halter served as Acting Commissioner of the SSA during the first months of the administration of George W. Bush. Halter then re-entered the private sector by joining the boards of directors of several companies in biotechnology and information technology, including Akamai Technologies, webMethods, InterMune, Threshold Pharmaceuticals and Xenogen.

== Political career ==
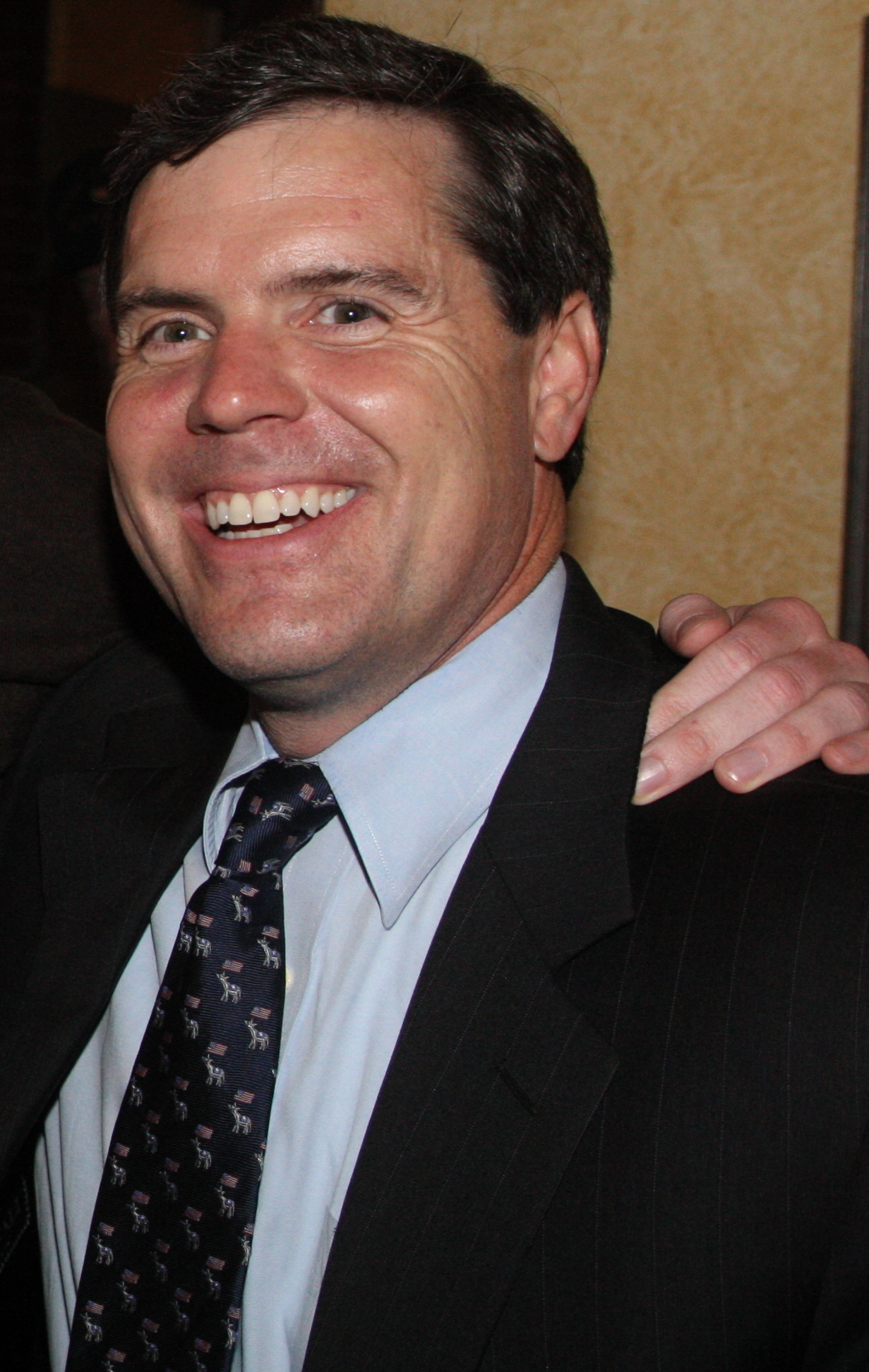
Halter in 2010

In the run-up to the 2006 Arkansas elections, Halter initially ran for Governor of Arkansas, but dropped out in March 2006 and instead ran for lieutenant governor. A pre-primary challenge argued that Halter did not satisfy the state constitution's seven-year residency requirement; the Arkansas Supreme Court affirmed a lower-court ruling that he was eligible to run. Halter led a four-candidate Democratic primary, defeated Tim Wooldridge in the runoff, and then defeated Jim Holt of Springdale, a conservative former Republican state legislator and Southern Baptist minister, in the general election.

In 2007, there was speculation that Halter would run for the United States Senate against incumbent Mark Pryor in 2008, but this did not occur. He chaired the Democratic Lieutenant Governors Association and the Southern Region of the National Lieutenant Governors Association. Halter was also closely identified with the campaign for an Arkansas Scholarship Lottery to fund college scholarships. After advocating a scholarship lottery during the 2006 campaign, his Hope for Arkansas organization placed a constitutional amendment on the 2008 ballot; voters approved it with 62.8 percent of the vote.

On March 1, 2010, Halter announced his candidacy in the 2010 U.S. Senate election, challenging two-term incumbent Blanche Lincoln in the Democratic primary. After one month of fund-raising, his campaign reported raising more than $2 million, much of it from outside Arkansas, while national labor unions and progressive organizations also spent heavily in the race. On May 18, Lincoln received 44.50 percent and Halter 42.53 percent, forcing a June 8 runoff; Lincoln won the runoff 52.00 percent to 48.00 percent. Lincoln ultimately lost the general election to Republican U.S. representative John Boozman. Halter later entered the 2014 gubernatorial race but withdrew in July 2013 after Ross entered the Democratic primary, citing a desire to avoid a divisive contest. He subsequently returned to business and became chief executive of Little Rock-based Scenic Hill Solar.

Halter has been described as an outspoken supporter of gay rights and a "classic populist, progressive Democrat". Contemporary coverage of the 2010 Senate race described his campaign as a challenge from the Democratic left and as drawing heavily on labor and progressive support, although Halter resisted a simple ideological label.

== Political positions ==
=== The economy ===
During his 2010 Senate campaign, Halter supported investment in clean energy, making broadband accessible to all Arkansans and raising the minimum wage. He opposed trade agreements that he said sent Arkansas jobs abroad and disadvantaged American workers by allowing competition with lower labor standards. He also argued that federal tax policy should reward companies for creating jobs in the United States rather than moving them overseas. Trade and job losses became recurring subjects of the campaign, including in advertising that was scrutinized by fact-checkers.

=== Education ===
A supporter of the scholarship lottery, which his campaign said would help about 28,000 Arkansas students afford higher education without raising taxes, Halter supported making loans and grants more affordable. He criticized Lincoln's support for private lenders participating in the federal student-loan system and supported the Student Aid and Fiscal Responsibility Act, which would expand federal Pell Grants and move new federally supported student lending to the Direct Loan program; he also criticized Lincoln for opposing the measure. The Congressional Budget Office estimated that the legislation's shift from guaranteed loans to direct lending would reduce direct federal spending by about $87 billion over 2010–2019 under standard federal credit-accounting rules, while estimating smaller savings when market risk was taken into account.

=== Health care ===
Halter backed President Barack Obama's efforts to reform health care, saying during the 2010 campaign that although the enacted Affordable Care Act could have been stronger, he supported the legislation and a public insurance option. His campaign said that the law would provide health-care coverage to 450,000 uninsured Arkansans and criticized Lincoln for weakening the legislation, claiming that she had sided with insurance companies and HMOs that had contributed more than $800,000 to her campaigns. Contemporary coverage identified Lincoln's opposition to a public option as one of the issues that contributed to labor and progressive support for Halter.

=== Farming and rural communities ===
Halter made agriculture one of his "top priorities", pledging to support farmers rather than corporate agribusiness. He argued that too much money was distributed in subsidies to recipients who did not need it while family farmers lacked sufficient support.

=== Consumer protection and financial reform ===
Halter repeatedly criticized Congress's relationship with special interests and lobby groups and argued that banks that received taxpayer money should be held accountable. He supported reforms intended to increase bank lending to Main Street and small businesses, create an independent consumer watchdog, limit what his campaign characterized as excessive corporate compensation, and strengthen checks on financial-industry practices following the 2008 financial crisis. Wall Street and the influence of large financial interests were prominent issues in his primary challenge to Lincoln.

== Family ==
Halter and his wife Shanti have two daughters. They have been members of Immaculate Conception Catholic Church in North Little Rock.

== Electoral history ==
Arkansas Lieutenant Governor general election, 2006
Party	Candidate	Votes	%	±%
Democratic	Bill Halter	437,490	57.36	+17.22
Republican	Jim Holt	325,215	42.64	−17.32
Turnout		762,705	47.22	
Democratic gain from Republican				

United States Senate Democratic primary in Arkansas, 2010
Party	Candidate	Votes	%
Democratic	Blanche Lincoln	146,579	44.50
Democratic	Bill Halter	140,081	42.53
Democratic	DC Morrison	42,695	12.96

United States Senate Democratic primary runoff in Arkansas, 2010
Party	Candidate	Votes	%	±%
Democratic	Blanche Lincoln	134,756	52.00	+7.50
Democratic	Bill Halter	124,405	48.00	+5.47

Party political offices
Preceded by Ron Sheffield	Democratic nominee for Lieutenant Governor of Arkansas; 2006	Succeeded by Shane Broadway
Political offices
Preceded by Ken Apfel	Commissioner of the Social Security Administration; Acting; 2001	Succeeded by Larry Massanari; Acting
Preceded by Win Rockefeller	Lieutenant Governor of Arkansas; 2007–2011	Succeeded by Mark Darr
