= Kenneth S. Apfel =

American politician (born 1948)

Ken Apfel
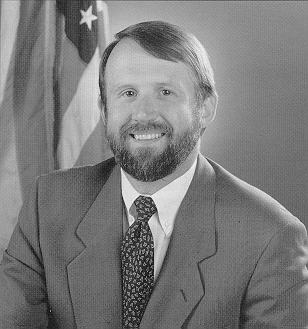
- Official portrait, 2001

13th Commissioner of the Social Security Administration
- In office September 29, 1997 – January 19, 2001
- President: Bill Clinton
- Preceded by: John J. Callahan (acting)
- Succeeded by: Bill Halter (acting)

Personal details
- Born: October 12, 1948 (age 77) Shrewsbury, Massachusetts, U.S.
- Party: Democratic
- Education: University of Massachusetts Amherst (BA); Northeastern University (MEd); University of Texas at Austin (MPA)

Kenneth S. Apfel (born October 12, 1948) was the 13th Commissioner of Social Security in the United States, filling a four-year term of office that ran from 1997 through 2001.

== Background ==
Apfel was born in Shrewsbury, Massachusetts. A graduate of University of Massachusetts Amherst, Northeastern University, and University of Texas at Austin, he started his federal career as a Presidential Management Intern at the United States Department of Labor.

Since 2006, he has held the position of Professor at the University of Maryland's School of Public Policy.

Prior to becoming Commissioner of the Social Security Administration in 1997, he had served as Associate Director for Human Resources at the Office of Management and Budget since 1995, and as Assistant Secretary for Management and Budget at the United States Department of Health and Human Services from 1993 to 1995.

Apfel is a Fellow of the National Academy of Public Administration.

Political offices
Preceded by John Callahan; Acting	Commissioner of the Social Security Administration; 1997–2001	Succeeded by Bill Halter; Acting
