= Gilbert Baker (politician) =

American politician

Gilbert R. Baker

Chair of the Arkansas Republican Party
- In office 2004–2007
- Preceded by: Winthrop Paul Rockefeller
- Succeeded by: Dennis Milligan

Member of the Arkansas Senate from the 30th district
- In office January 8, 2001 – January 6, 2013
- Preceded by: Stanley Russ
- Succeeded by: Jason Rapert

Personal details
- Born: September 5, 1956 (age 69) Monahans, Texas, U.S.
- Party: Republican
- Spouse: Susan Baker
- Children: 8
- Education: Louisiana Tech University; University of Arizona
- Occupation: Teacher/Administrator/Advisor, University of Central Arkansas
- Website: Baker for Senate

Gilbert R. Baker (born September 5, 1956) is an American politician and member of the Republican Party who represented District 30 in the Arkansas State Senate for District 30 from 2001 to 2013.

== Biography ==
A native of Monahans in West Texas, Baker holds a Bachelor of Fine Arts from Louisiana Tech University in Ruston, Louisiana and a master's degree from the University of Arizona at Tucson, Arizona.

== Arkansas State Senator ==
Baker ranked third in Arkansas State Senate seniority in his final term, and served as co-chair of the Joint Budget Committee and vice chairman of the State Agencies and Governmental Affairs Committee. He also served on the Arkansas Legislative Council, the Public Health, Welfare and Labor Committee, Legislative Facilities, Children and Youth Committee, Senate Efficiency, and Academic Facilities Oversight Committee. From 1997 to 1999, he was the Republican chairman for Faulkner County.

Term-limited in 2012, he left the Senate to become the executive assistant to the president at the University of Central Arkansas at Conway, where he resides.

== Candidacy for United States Senate ==
In September 2009, Baker announced his intentions to run for the U.S. Senate. He joined a crowded GOP field. Polls showed discontent with Lincoln's Senate performance and voting record. A poll taken November 5, 2009, showed Lincoln with a 43 percent job-approval rating, nearly 9 points down from her 2008 approval rating.

After announcing for the U.S. Senate, Baker was endorsed by twenty-three members of the State House and Senate. On December 5, 2009, Baker won a straw poll in Hot Springs with 35 percent of the vote in a field of seven.

He was considered to have been the front-runner until U.S. Representative John Boozman entered the race and won the nomination and subsequently the general election, Baker finished in third in the primary behind Boozman and former State Senator Jim Holt, a Baptist minister from Springdale.

== Indictment by Federal Grand Jury ==
On January 11, 2019, Baker was indicted on counts of conspiracy, bribery and wire fraud. The indictment is related to a bribery scheme involving former Faulkner County Circuit Judge Mike Maggio. In a trial in August 2021, the jury found Baker not guilty of conspiracy to commit bribery but deadlocked on remaining bribery and honest service wire fraud. A retrial on the remaining charges was set for May 2022. However, the U.S. Attorney for the Eastern District of Arkansas declined to refile the charges.
