= Doug Matayo =

American politician

Member of the Arkansas House of Representatives from the 93rd district
- In office January 13, 2003 – January 8, 2007
- Preceded by: Marvin Childers
- Succeeded by: Jon Woods

Personal details
- Born: February 1, 1972 (age 54) Peoria, Illinois
- Party: Republican

Doug Matayo (born February 1, 1972) is an American politician who served in the Arkansas House of Representatives from the 93rd district from 2003 to 2007.
