= 2004 United States Senate election in Arkansas =

- November 2, 2004
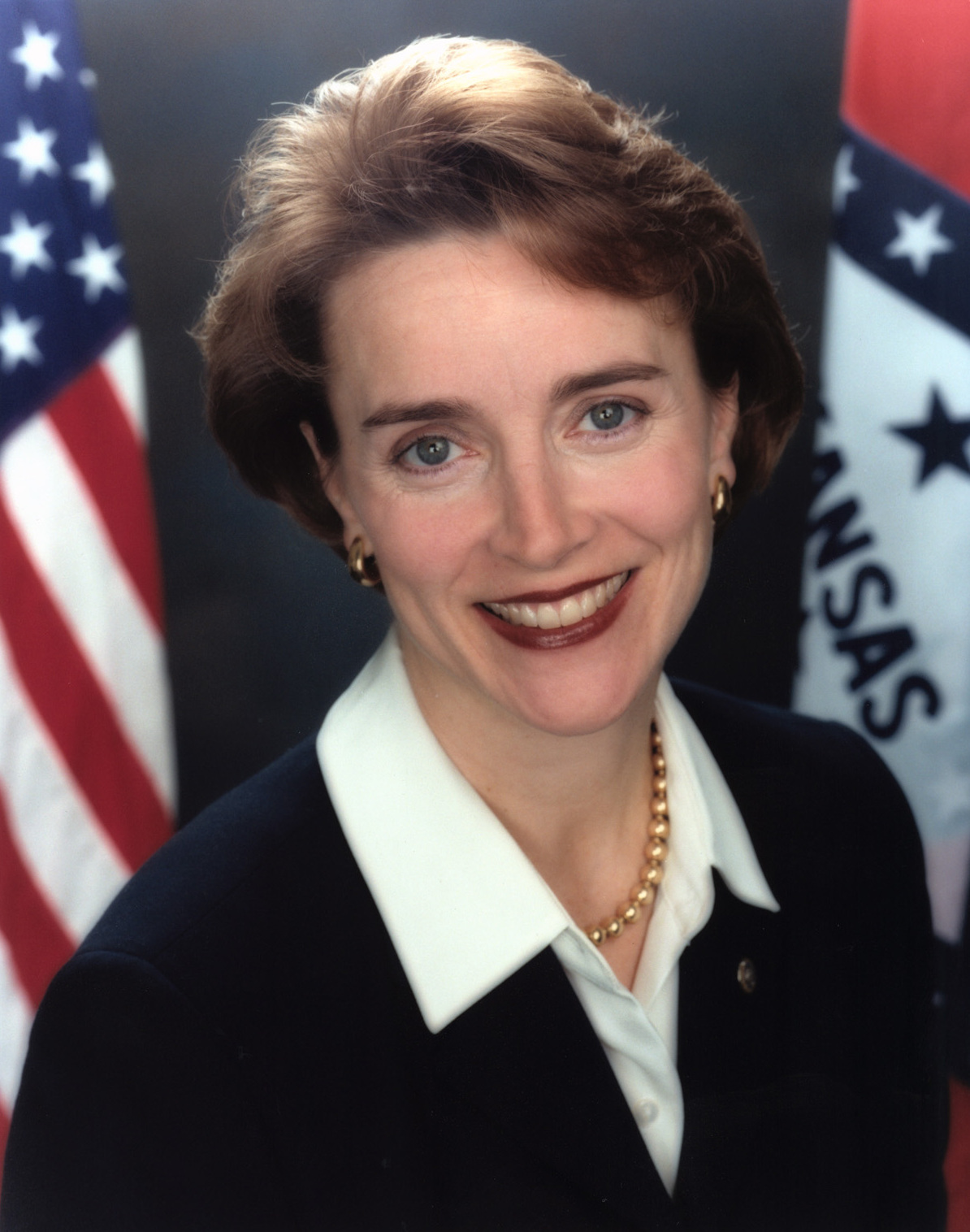

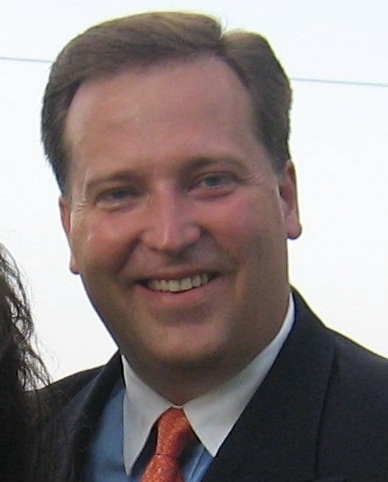
Nominee	Blanche Lincoln	Jim Holt
Party	Democratic	Republican
Popular vote	580,973	458,036
Percentage	55.90%	44.07%
- Lincoln: 50–60% 60–70% 70–80% Holt: 50–60%
U.S. senator before election
Blanche Lincoln
Democratic
Elected U.S. Senator
Blanche Lincoln
Democratic

The 2004 United States Senate election in Arkansas took place on November 2, 2004, alongside other elections to the United States Senate in other states, elections to the United States House of Representatives, and various state and local elections.

Incumbent Democratic Senator Blanche Lincoln won re-election to a second term in office, despite George W. Bush winning the state in the same election cycle.

As of 2026, this was the last time Democrats won the Class 3 Senate seat from Arkansas, and also the last time Arkansas elected a woman to the United States Congress.

== Background ==
Incumbent Democrat Blanche Lincoln ran for re-election. Lincoln won re-election over Republican State Senator Jim Holt, while President George W. Bush carried the state with almost the same margin of victory.

The Democratic Party held super-majority status in the Arkansas General Assembly. A majority of local and statewide offices were also held by Democrats. This was rare in the modern South, where a majority of statewide offices are held by Republicans. Arkansas had the distinction in 1992 of being the only state in the country to give the majority of its vote to a single candidate in the presidential election—native son Bill Clinton—while every other state's electoral votes were won by pluralities of the vote among the three candidates. Arkansas has become more reliably Republican in presidential elections in recent years. The state voted for John McCain in 2008 by a margin of 20 percentage points, making it one of the few states in the country to vote more Republican than it had in 2004, the others being Louisiana, Oklahoma, Tennessee and West Virginia. Obama's relatively poor showing in Arkansas was likely due to a lack of enthusiasm from state Democrats following former Arkansas First Lady Hillary Clinton's failure to win the nomination, and his relatively poor performance among rural white voters (Clinton, however, herself lost the state by an even greater margin as the Democratic nominee in 2016).

Democrats had an overwhelming majority of registered voters, the Democratic Party of Arkansas is more conservative than the national entity. Two of Arkansas' three Democratic Representatives were members of the Blue Dog Coalition, which tends to be more pro-business, pro-military, and socially conservative than the center-left Democratic mainstream. Reflecting the state's large evangelical population, the state has a strong social conservative bent. Under the Arkansas Constitution Arkansas is a right to work state, its voters passed a ban on same-sex marriage, with 74% voting yes, and the state is one of a handful that has legislation on its books banning abortion.

== Republican primary ==
=== Candidates ===
==== Declared ====
- Rosemarie Clampitt, retired actress
- Jim Holt, state senator
- Andy Lee, Benton County sheriff

=== Results ===
Republican primary results
Party	Candidate	Votes	%
Republican	Jim Holt	37,254	68.9%
Republican	Andy Lee	10,709	19.8%
Republican	Rosemarie Clampitt	6,078	11.3%
Total votes		54,041	100.0%

== General election ==
=== Candidates ===
- Jim Holt (R), state senator
- Blanche Lincoln (D), incumbent U.S. senator

=== Campaign ===
Lincoln was a popular incumbent. In March, she had an approval rating of 55%. Lincoln called herself an advocate for rural America, having grown up on a farm herself. Holt was from Northwest Arkansas, and was also living on a farm. Holt was widely known as a long shot. By the end of June, he had raised just $29,000, while Lincoln had over $5 million cash on hand.

=== Debates ===
- Complete video of debate, October 28, 2004

=== Predictions ===
Source	Ranking	As of
Sabato's Crystal Ball	Safe D	November 1, 2004

=== Polling ===
Poll source	Date(s) administered	Sample size (Note: Key: A – all adults RV – registered voters LV – likely voters V – unclear)	Margin of error	Blanche Lincoln (D)	Jim Holt (R)	Other / Undecided
SurveyUSA	October 31 – November 1, 2004	549 (LV)	± 4.3%	53%	43%	4%

=== Results ===
Arkansas Senate election 2004
Party	Candidate	Votes	%
Democratic	Blanche Lincoln (incumbent)	580,973	55.90%
Republican	Jim Holt	458,036	44.07%
Write-in		340	0.03%
Total votes		1,039,349	100.0%

==== Counties that flipped from Democratic to Republican ====
- Cleburne (largest city: Heber Springs)
- Lonoke (largest city: Cabot)
- Montgomery (largest city: Mount Ida)
- Pike (largest city: Glenwood)
- Pope (largest city: Russellville)
- Saline (largest city: Benton)
- Scott (largest city: Waldron)
- Stone (largest city: Mountain View)

==== Counties that flipped from Republican to Democratic ====
- Union (largest city: El Dorado)
- Washington (largest city: Fayetteville)

==== By congressional district ====
Lincoln won three of four congressional districts.

District	Lincoln	Holt	Representative
1st	59%	41%	Marion Berry
2nd	59%	41%	Vic Snyder
3rd	47%	53%	John Boozman
4th	59%	41%	Mike Ross

== See also ==
- 2004 United States Senate elections
- 2002 United States Senate election in Arkansas
- 2008 United States Senate election in Arkansas
