= Arkansas Business Publishing Group =

American magazine and newspaper publisher

- Company type: Private
- Industry: Publisher
- Genre: Newspaper, magazine, electronic publishing
- Headquarters: Little Rock, Arkansas, United States
- Services: Print, event and digital marketing, custom publishing, website design
- Owner: Mitch Bettis (100%)
- Number of employees: 80
- Parent: Five Legged Stool, LLC.
- Website: ABPG.com

Arkansas Business Publishing Group is a magazine and newspaper publisher based in Little Rock, Arkansas, United States. The company produces a variety of annual, biannual, monthly and weekly publications for various niche audiences in the state, including flagship business weekly newspaper Arkansas Business launched in 1984, monthly Little Rock Family and monthly fashion and philanthropy magazine Little Rock Soirée.

The company has a web design and development division, FLEX360 Web Development, formed in 2003.

== Arkansas Business ==
Since 1988, Arkansas Business has hosted a yearly awards ceremony honoring Arkansas businesses. The Arkansas Business of the Year awards are given for six categories: businesses with 1–25 employees, businesses for 26–75 employees, businesses with 76–300 employees, business executive of the year, nonprofit organization and nonprofit executive of the year.

== Selected publications ==
- Arkansas Bride, biannual
- Arkansas Business, weekly
- Arkansas Green Guide, annual
- Arkansas Next: A Guide to Life After High School, annual
- Book of Lists, annual
- Greenhead, annual
- Hot Springs Guest Guide, annual
- Lease Guide, annual
- Little Rock Beauty Black Book, annual
- Little Rock Family, monthly
- Little Rock Guest Guide, annual
- Little Rock Soirée, monthly
- Living in Arkansas, annual
- Meeting Planner, annual
- Metro Little Rock Guide, annual
