= Brent Talley =

American politician

James Brent Talley

Member of the Arkansas House of Representatives from the 3rd district
- In office 2013–2017
- Preceded by: David Powers
- Succeeded by: Danny Watson

Personal details
- Party: Democratic
- Spouse: Karen
- Education: Southern Arkansas University

Brent Talley was a former Democratic member of the Arkansas House of Representatives, representing the 3rd district from 2013 to 2017.
