= Mark Darr =

American politician

19th Lieutenant Governor of Arkansas
- In office January 11, 2011 – February 1, 2014
- Governor: Mike Beebe
- Preceded by: Bill Halter
- Succeeded by: Tim Griffin (2015)

Personal details
- Born: Mark Alan Darr; July 3, 1973 (age 53) Fort Smith, Arkansas, U.S.
- Party: Republican
- Spouse: Kimberly Darr
- Children: 2
- Education: Ouachita Baptist University
- Religion: Southern Baptist

Mark A. Darr (born July 3, 1973) is an American politician from Springdale, Arkansas, who was his state's 19th lieutenant governor from 2011 to 2014. A member of the Republican Party, he was elected in 2010 to succeed Democrat Bill Halter. To win the second-ranking post in state government, he defeated another Democrat, state Senator and former House Speaker Shane Broadway by a margin of 51 to 49 percent.

On February 1, 2014, under sanction for ethics violations involving illegal use of campaign funds, Darr resigned as lieutenant governor.

== Early life and education ==
Darr was born in Fort Smith in Sebastian County, Arkansas. He is a graduate of Mansfield High School in Mansfield, Arkansas, and Ouachita Baptist University in Arkadelphia, Arkansas.

== Lieutenant Governor of Arkansas ==
Darr narrowly won the Republican nomination for lieutenant governor in 2010. He defeated subsequent State Representative Donnie Copeland of North Little Rock, 64,883 votes (51.9 percent) to 60,072 votes (48.1 percent).

Darr was elected Lieutenant Governor on November 2, 2010, the youngest Republican to date to win a statewide race in his state. Prior to the election, he had never before run for public office.

On August 12, 2013, Darr announced his candidacy for Arkansas's 4th congressional district. He ended his candidacy after questions were raised about campaign expenditures during his 2010 campaign for lieutenant governor. On August 29, 2013, Darr ended his campaign for Congress.

=== Scandal and resignation ===
In late November 2013, questions of ethics violations arose after Darr reportedly filed incorrect and misleading campaign financial disclosure statements. Darr maintained his innocence, but state Democrats and fellow Republicans threatened impeachment proceedings if Darr did not step down.

An ethics commission accused Darr of breaking the Arkansas Code eleven times and using approximately $31,572.74 from his campaign funds for personal expenses. On December 30, 2013, he signed a letter stating he would pay the state's $11,000 Ethics Commission fine but maintained his mistakes were unintentional. Darr announced on January 10, 2014, that he would resign from his office effective February 1, 2014.

Darr failed to officially notify Governor Mike Beebe, a Democrat, that he was resigning. Beebe was the only constitutional officer who could declare the office vacant. Darr did forward copies to Republican elected state officials. He did not immediately pay the $11,000 Ethics Commission fine, but according to The Baxter Bulletin, local officials have said he will "pay soon". Darr and his wife filed for bankruptcy in June 2015.

== Personal life ==
Darr and his wife, Kim, have two children. He is a licensed insurance agent and also co-owns two restaurants in Rogers, Arkansas. The Darrs reside in Springdale, the state's fourth largest city. They are members of the megachurch (Southern Baptist) Cross Church (formerly known as First Baptist Church of Springdale). They sing in the church choir.

Party political offices
Preceded by Jim Holt	Republican nominee for Lieutenant Governor of Arkansas; 2010	Succeeded by Tim Griffin
Political offices
Preceded by Bill Halter	Lieutenant Governor of Arkansas; 2011–2014	Succeeded by Tim Griffin
