= Robert F. Thompson =

American politician (born 1971)

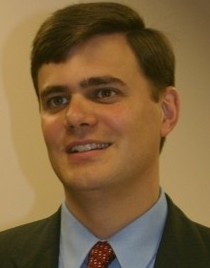

Member of the Arkansas Senate from the 11th district
- In office 2007–2013
- Preceded by: Tim Wooldridge
- Succeeded by: Jimmy Hickey Jr.

Member of the Arkansas Senate from the 20th district
- In office 2013–2015
- Succeeded by: Blake Johnson

Member of the Arkansas House of Representatives from the 78th district
- In office 2005–2007

Personal details
- Born: June 19, 1971 (age 55) Paragould, Arkansas, USA
- Party: Democratic
- Spouse: Tori Gibson Thompson
- Children: Three children
- Education: Hendrix College (B.A.); University of St. Andrews (Graduate Diploma); University of Arkansas School of Law (J.D.)
- Profession: Attorney

Robert F. Thompson (born June 19, 1971) is a former Democratic member of the Arkansas Senate. He represented the 11th District of Arkansas from 2007 to 2013. After senate districts were reorganized, he went on to represent District 20 from 2013 to 2015. Both districts included several counties in northeast Arkansas. From 2005 to 2007, he was a State Representative for the 78th district of the Arkansas House of Representatives, representing the city of Paragould in Greene County, Arkansas. Thompson currently practices law at the Paragould law firm of Branch, Thompson, Warmath, & Dale P.A.

== Biography ==
Thompson is a native of Paragould. Born at Community Methodist Hospital in Paragould, Arkansas on June 19, 1971, he was reared in Paragould and attended Paragould public schools. He attended Hendrix College in Conway, Arkansas, graduating summa cum laude in 1993 with a Bachelor of Arts in history. Following college, Thompson attended the University of St Andrews in Scotland on a Rotary Foundation Scholarship. He graduated from the University of Arkansas School of Law in 1997. In law school, he served as editor-in-chief of the Arkansas Law Review and graduated first in his class .

From 1997 to 1998, Thompson served as a law clerk to Chief Judge Richard S. Arnold of the United States Court of Appeals for the Eighth Circuit. Later, as a member of the Arkansas House of Representatives, following the death of Judge Arnold in September 2004, Thompson was a sponsor of a House Resolution celebrating the life of Judge Arnold and his contributions to the American legal system.

Thompson has been awarded two honors by the Arkansas Historical Association for his writings about Arkansas history. In 1993 he won the Lucille Westbrook Award for an essay about debt slavery in Arkansas in the 1930s. In 1998, he won the Violet Gingles Award for his short biography of the Arkansas legislator Paul Van Dalsem.

In 2008 Thompson was named as one of 24 fellows in the 2008 class of the Aspen Institute's Rodel Fellowships in Public Leadership.

Thompson is married to the former Tori Gibson of Osceola, Arkansas. They have two sons and a daughter. He is an active member of the First United Methodist Church of Paragould.

== Political career ==
In November 2004, Thompson was elected to the Arkansas House of Representatives, District 78, which includes the city of Paragould. As a member of the House, he sat on the House Judiciary Committee, the House Committee on State Agencies and Governmental Affairs, and the Joint Public Retirement Committee. During the 2005 legislative session, Thompson sponsored bills that created a Drug Court for Greene County, strengthened laws on prosecuting sexual offenders, and addressed financial problems of recently consolidated school districts.

In June 2004 he was one of Arkansas Business's "40 Under 40" up-and-coming young leaders. In December 2004, he was selected as NEA Business Today's 25 Outstanding Young Professionals in northeast Arkansas. In May 2005, Thompson was named one of five "promising legislative newcomers" by the Arkansas Democrat-Gazette.

In 2006, Thompson ran for the District 11 state senate seat being vacated by State Senator Tim Wooldridge, who was forced out of office due to term limits. On May 23, Thompson defeated Paragould resident and former state representative Gary Biggs in the Democratic primary election for the District 11 seat. As the Democratic nominee in the general election, Thompson defeated Republican Lloyd Clark in a landslide, 72.36% to 27.64%. Thompson was the Majority Leader of the Senate prior to the Republican takeover in 2013. He was defeated in a rematch with Republican Blake Johnson of Corning (Clay County) in the 2014 General election. Thompson had defeated Johnson by less than 600 votes in 2012.

In the senate, Thompson served as vice-chair of the Legislative Council, the committee that oversees legislative operations when the Arkansas legislature is not in session. Thompson was also a member of the Senate Judiciary Committee, Senate Committee on State Agencies and Governmental Affairs, and the Senate Efficiency Committee, which administers the internal operations of the Arkansas Senate.

== Bibliography ==
- "The Strange Case of Paul D. Peacher, Twentieth-Century Slaveholder." Arkansas Historical Quarterly 52:4 (Winter 1993): 426-451.
- "McKennon v. Nashville Banner Publishing Co.: The Masquerading Doctor, the 'Greatest Treason,' and After-Acquired Evidence in Employment Discrimination Suits." Arkansas Law Review 49:3 (1996): 625-660.
- "The Arkansas Products Liability Statute: What Does 'Unreasonably Dangerous' Mean in Arkansas?" Arkansas Law Review 50:4 (1998): 663-690.
- "Barefoot and Pregnant: The Education of Paul Van Dalsem." Arkansas Historical Quarterly 57:4 (Winter 1998): 377-407.
