= Mike Beebe =

Governor of Arkansas from 2007 to 2015

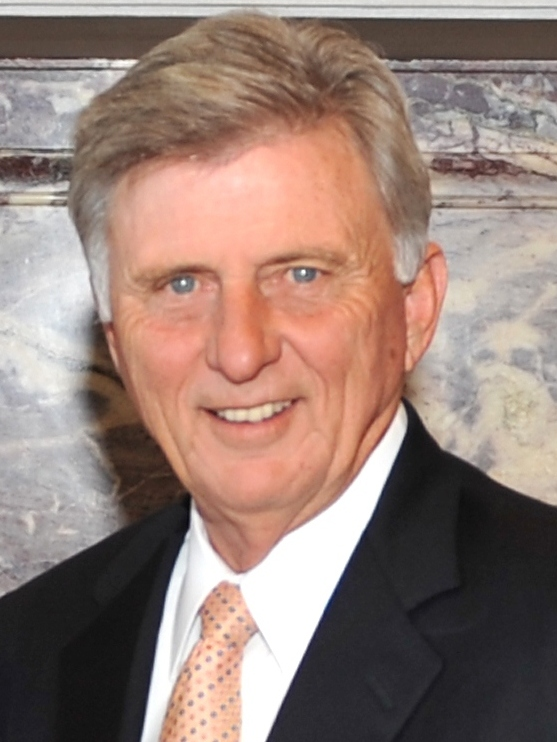
- Beebe in 2009

45th Governor of Arkansas
- In office January 9, 2007 – January 13, 2015
- Lieutenant: Bill Halter; Mark Darr
- Preceded by: Mike Huckabee
- Succeeded by: Asa Hutchinson

54th Attorney General of Arkansas
- In office January 3, 2003 – January 9, 2007
- Governor: Mike Huckabee
- Preceded by: Mark Pryor
- Succeeded by: Dustin McDaniel

Member of the Arkansas Senate
- In office January 10, 1983 – January 3, 2003
- Preceded by: Bill Walmsley
- Succeeded by: John Paul Capps
- Constituency: 29th district (1983–1993); 21st district (1993–2003)

Personal details
- Born: Mickey Dale Beebe; December 28, 1946 (age 79) Amagon, Arkansas, U.S.
- Party: Democratic
- Spouse: Ginger Croom (m. 1979)
- Children: 3
- Education: Arkansas State University, Jonesboro (BA); University of Arkansas (JD)

Military service
- Allegiance: United States
- Branch/service: United States Army
- Years of service: 1968–1974
- Unit: United States Army Reserve

Mickey Dale Beebe (/ˈbiːbi/; born December 28, 1946) is an American politician and attorney who served as the 45th governor of Arkansas from 2007 to 2015. He is to date the last Democrat to hold that office.

Born in Amagon, Arkansas, Beebe is a graduate of Arkansas State University in Jonesboro and the University of Arkansas in Fayetteville. Beebe entered private practice as an attorney before being elected to the Arkansas Senate in 1982. Beebe served five terms in the Arkansas Senate from 1983 to 2003 and served as President of the Senate during his last term. Beebe was elected Attorney General of Arkansas in 2002, where he served one term from 2003 to 2007.

A member of the Democratic Party, Beebe ran for the governorship in 2006, winning in an uncontested Democratic primary and defeating former U.S. Representative Asa Hutchinson in the general election with 56% of the vote. Beebe was elected to a second term in 2010, defeating former State Senator Jim Keet with 64% of the vote in contrast to fellow Democrat Blanche Lincoln who lost her second U.S. Senate re-election bid in a 58%–37% landslide. Beebe, who was restricted from running in the 2014 election due to term limits, left office on January 13, 2015.

Beebe currently serves on the Governors’ Council of the Bipartisan Policy Center in Washington, D.C., and has endorsed Medicaid work requirements since leaving office.

== Early life and education ==
Beebe was born in Amagon, a small town in Jackson County, Arkansas. He was raised by his mother, a waitress, and never met his father. As a child, he moved often with his family. They lived in Detroit, St. Louis, Chicago, Houston and Alamogordo, New Mexico. They returned to Newport, Arkansas, where Beebe graduated from high school at the age of seventeen in 1964.

Beebe received a Bachelor of Arts degree in political science from Arkansas State University in 1968, where he was a member of Sigma Pi fraternity. He earned his juris doctor from the University of Arkansas in 1972. Beebe served in the U.S. Army Reserve from 1968 to 1974.

Beebe is an Episcopalian.

== Early political career ==
After the incumbent senator from his newly redrawn district unexpectedly dropped out of the race, Beebe was left without a primary or general election opponent and was elected to the Arkansas State Senate in 1982, where he would serve for 20 years. He never faced an opponent in his twenty-year Senate career in which he became known as one of the most effective legislators based on his pragmatic deal-making ability. During his last session in the state senate, Beebe was elected president pro tempore of the body. In 2002, he was elected Arkansas Attorney General, a position he held for the four years prior to his election as governor.

== Governor of Arkansas (2007–2015) ==
=== Elections ===
==== 2006 ====
On June 14, 2005, Beebe announced his candidacy for the Democratic Party's nomination to run for Governor of Arkansas. Beebe defeated former Republican Congressman and Drug Enforcement Administration (DEA) chief Asa Hutchinson as well as the Green Party candidate and independent candidate Rod Bryan in the general election on November 7, 2006, capturing 55 percent of the vote.

Beebe was sworn in as governor on January 9, 2007. He was elected to the Democratic Governors Association Executive Committee for 2008–2009.

==== 2010 ====
Beebe was challenged by Republican nominee Jim Keet, a former state legislator from Little Rock. Beebe defeated Keet 64% to 34%

=== First term (2007-2011) ===
On his official website, Beebe outlined some of the policies he pursued during his first term. He outlined a plan for a balanced budget and attempted to cut middle class taxes by slashing in half the percentage of the state's grocery tax and increasing the Homestead Property Tax Credit, which can provide for the lowering of property taxes.

Beebe focused heavily on education reform. He called for an additional $19 million per year to be spent on assisting special needs students and designed a program that attempts to increase the quality of teachers within Arkansas by providing alternative pay and mentoring to motivate bright students to enter education or young teachers to work in struggling rural schools. Beebe has rejected calls to allow for Social Security private accounts to be established. He has also made plans to phase out the tax on utilities for manufacturers.

He outlined a 12-point plan to make health care more accessible and affordable. Some of his proposals include using federal tax credits to make private insurance cheaper, expanding Medicaid, increasing use of preventive care to stop health concerns before they grow worse, expanding school health clinics, and using home and community-based care as an alternative to nursing homes.

=== Second term (2011-2015) ===
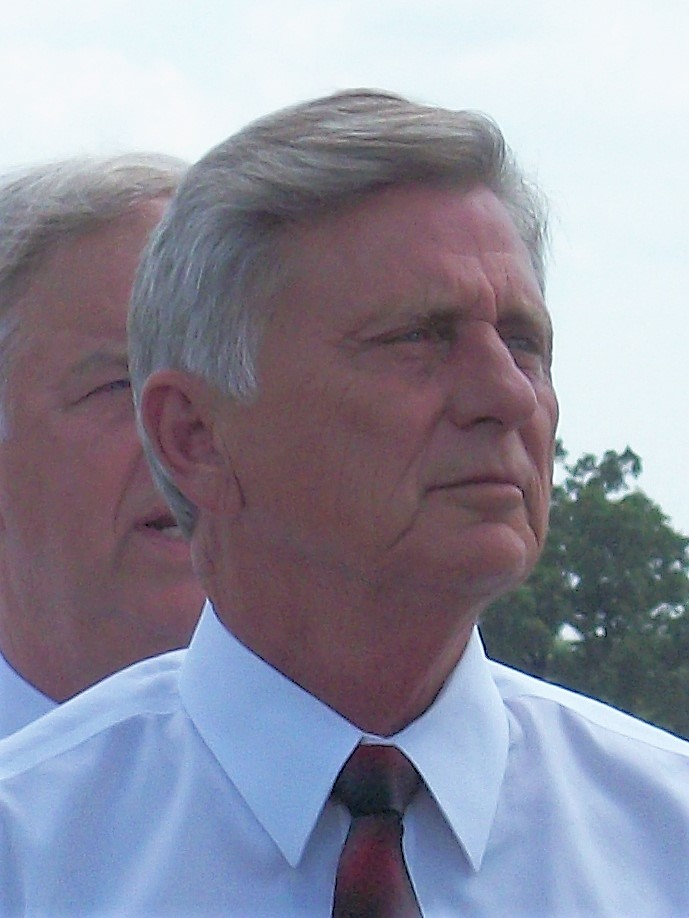
Governor Beebe attended the groundbreaking for the Bella Vista Bypass with Ray LaHood and Mark Pryor in 2011

In January 2011, he said that he supported a tax increase for highway funding saying "If they pass a tax increase for highways and it was reasonable, I'd sign it. I don't think it's going to happen."

In January 2012, he proposed a $163 million funding increase in a $4.7 billion state budget. He called for $117 million increase in the Human Services Department and a $56 million increase in public schools. He also called for an audit of the state's Forestry Commission's finances after a $4 million shortfall and a layoff of 36 workers.

In the 2012 elections, Republicans gained control of both houses of the General Assembly for the first time since 1874 after making major gains two years earlier. This made Beebe the first Democratic Governor of Arkansas ever to face a Republican-controlled legislature. The GOP margin was 21 to 14 in the Senate, and 51 to 48 in the House (with one Green). In his 2013 State of the State address, Beebe made a comprehensive case for Medicaid expansion. In April 2013, Beebe signed into law Arkansas's "private option" to use federal Medicaid money to purchase private insurance for thousands of low-income residents. To become law, the proposal needed a two-thirds majority vote. The state's General Assembly, with Republicans in the majority, narrowly approved the three necessary bills to establish and finance the insurance program.

Beebe did not see his approval rating slip below 70 percent at any point during his tenure, according to yearly polls from the University of Arkansas. According to the FiveThirtyEight Blog, "[Beebe's] crossover appeal — and the recent history in Arkansas of producing a popular Democratic president—might suggest Mr. Beebe, who will be term-limited in 2014, would be among the more talked-about 2016 contenders"; however, Beebe ultimately did not run for president in 2016.

On November 12, 2014, two months before the end of his term, Beebe said he intended to pardon his son for a 2003 felony drug possession conviction.

== Post-governorship ==
In March 2015, Beebe joined the Roberts Law Firm PA of Little Rock. In December 2015, he was named to the board of directors for Tyson Foods.

== Electoral history ==
=== As Governor of Arkansas ===
==== 2006 ====
Arkansas Gubernatorial Election 2006
Party	Candidate	Votes	%	±%
Democratic	Mike Beebe	430,765	55.6	
Republican	Asa Hutchinson	315,040	41.7	

==== 2010 ====
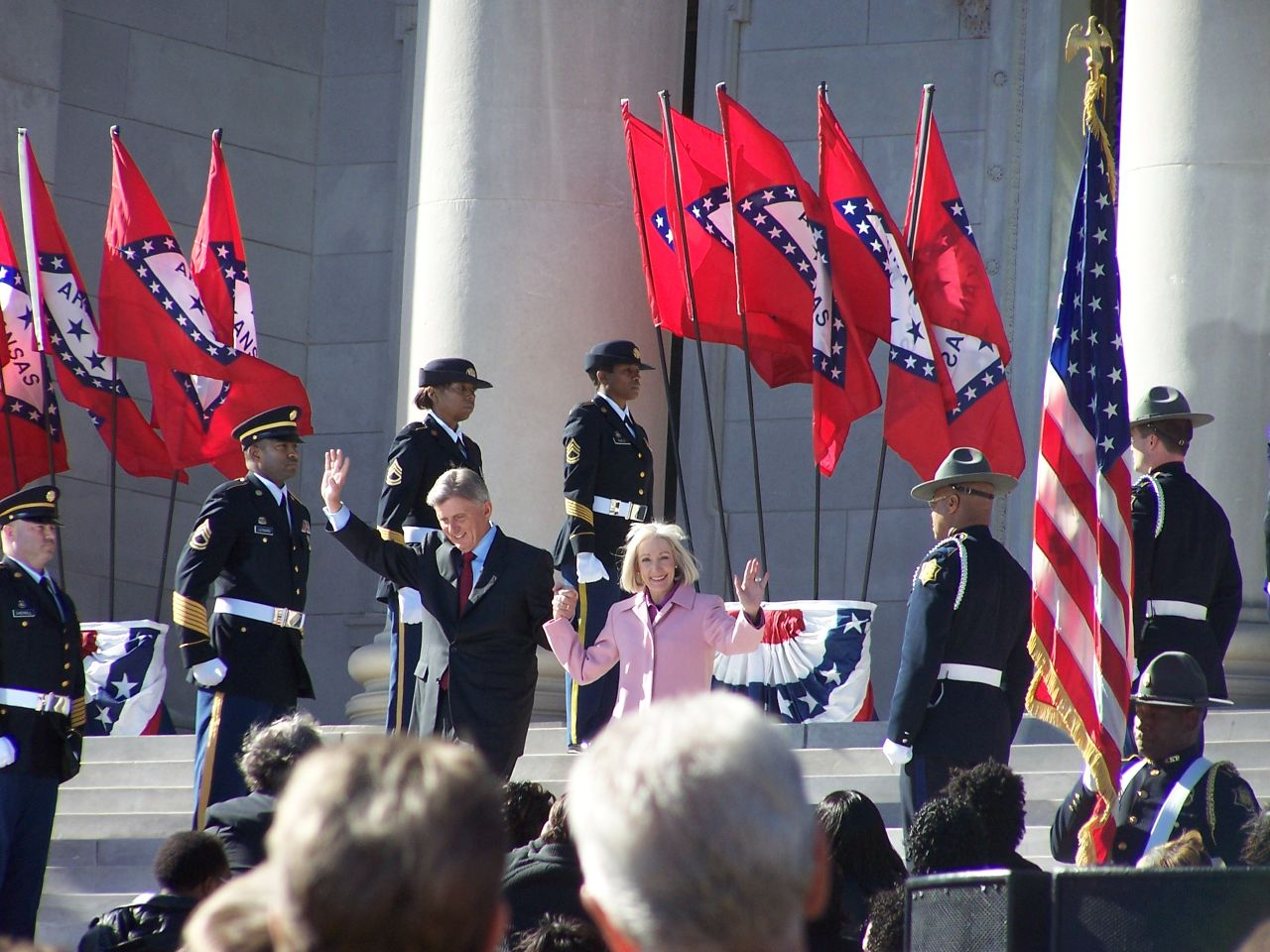
Inauguration, Little Rock, Arkansas, January 9, 2007

Arkansas Gubernatorial Election 2010
Party	Candidate	Votes	%	±%
Democratic	Mike Beebe (incumbent)	503,336	64.42	
Republican	Jim Keet	262,764	33.63	
Green	Jim Lendall	14,513	1.86	

== See also ==
- List of governors of Arkansas

Party political offices
Preceded by Mark Pryor	Democratic nominee for Attorney General of Arkansas; 2002	Succeeded by Dustin McDaniel
Preceded by Jimmie Lou Fisher	Democratic nominee for Governor of Arkansas; 2006, 2010	Succeeded by Mike Ross
Legal offices
Preceded by Mark Pryor	Attorney General of Arkansas; 2003–2007	Succeeded by Dustin McDaniel
Political offices
Preceded by Mike Huckabee	Governor of Arkansas; 2007–2015	Succeeded by Asa Hutchinson
U.S. order of precedence (ceremonial)
Preceded by Mike Huckabee as Former Governor	Order of precedence of the United States	Succeeded by Asa Hutchinson as Former Governor
