= Jim Holt (Arkansas politician) =

American politician

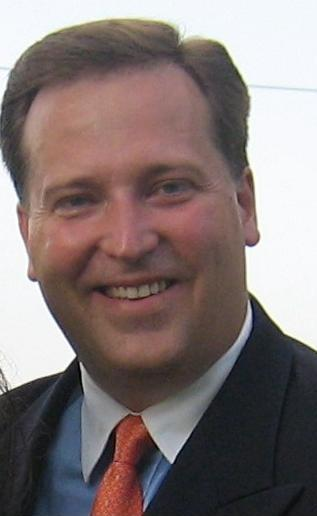

Member of the Arkansas Senate from the 35th district
- In office 2003–2006

Member of the Arkansas House of Representatives from the 5th district
- In office 2001–2003

Personal details
- Born: January 17, 1965 (age 61) Camden, Arkansas, U.S.
- Party: Republican
- Spouse: Bobye Barenberg (sep. 2023)
- Children: 11
- Occupation: Small business owner
- Website: www.jimholt2010.com

Jim L. Holt (born January 17, 1965) is an American Baptist minister and a conservative Republican politician from Springdale in northwestern Arkansas.

== Background ==
Holt was born in Camden in Ouachita County, southern Arkansas. He joined the military in 1987 and served in the U.S. Army Joint Intelligence Operations at the National Security Agency. His website notes he "was involved in highly classified operations during the Cold War, the ousting of Manuel Noriega from Panama, and Operation Desert Storm". He is a "small business owner/operator and a part-time counselor". In 1996, Holt became an ordained Southern Baptist minister. He is married to his wife, the former Bobye Barenberg, originally of Rogers, Arkansas; they have eleven children.

Jim Holt, once a close friend of Jim Bob Duggar and a key character in the documentary “Shiny Happy People: Duggar Family Secrets,” had an order of protection granted against him by his wife, Bobye Holt, on April 21, 2023. More court records indicate Samuel Holt, one of the couple’s sons, was also granted an order of protection against Jim Holt on May 8, 2023.

== Political career ==
Holt was first elected to the Arkansas House of Representatives in the 2000 general election. He served in the House from 2001 to 2003, during which time, he sponsored a bill designed to prohibit the teaching of the theory of evolution in Arkansas public schools (see Evolution below). Holt was elected to the Arkansas Senate in the 2002 general election and served there until December 31, 2006.

In 2004, Holt was the Republican nominee for the U. S. Senate. He was defeated by the Democrat Blanche Lincoln, 56%-44%.

In 2006, Holt was the Republican nominee for lieutenant governor and was defeated by Democrat Bill Halter, 57%-43%.

In 2010, Holt was a candidate in the Republican primary for U.S. Senate and was defeated by Republican John Boozman, 53%-17%, with the remaining percent divided among six other GOP candidates. Boozman in turn unseated Lincoln, against whom Holt had run six years earlier.

== Political positions ==
=== Evolution ===
Holt co-sponsored Arkansas House Bill 2548 in 2001, which would have required public schools to identify evolution as an unproven theory and would have prohibited the use of public funds for the promotion of evolution-related information as fact. The bill was sponsored by several other House members, including Representative Jack Critcher, who later became the Democratic President Pro Tempore of the Arkansas Senate. The measure fell six votes short of passage. Holt was criticized in July 2006 by Don Michael, an opinion writer for the Fayetteville Northwest Arkansas Times, for having invited in April 2001 the creationist Kent Hovind to speak on behalf of the bill before a House committee.

=== Abortion ===
Holt has also attempted to halt or restrict abortion. He has called for the overturning of Roe v. Wade as an example of "judicial tyranny plaguing our nation today. The laws in all fifty states were overturned, and the consent of the governed as the basis for all just governmental power was thrown out. I will not confirm a federal judicial nominee who I believe will vote to uphold Roe vs. Wade."

=== Healthcare ===
Holt opposes the healthcare reform measures implemented by the U.S. Congress in March 2010, stating "We don’t need health care 'reform', but remove government from the health sector and let the market decide.

The number of Arkansas residents on Medicare went from 457,808 to 917,474 (from 2013 to 2021). This doubled the number of recipients of government subsidized healthcare.

=== Opposition to Mike Huckabee ===
As a legislator, Holt tangled publicly with former Governor Mike Huckabee over immigration. In 2007, Holt opposed Huckabee's unsuccessful effort to make children of illegal immigrants eligible for state-funded scholarships and in-state tuition to Arkansas colleges, a position also adopted in Texas under Republican Governor Rick Perry. Holt defended his position by asking Huckabee if he would allow the same privileges to families of military personnel deployed overseas. Huckabee did not respond.

On January 18, 2008, the Northwest Arkansas Times ran an opinion piece by Holt blasting Huckabee and his supporters. Holt accused Huckabee's followers of not researching what Huckabee's positions are, and supporting him merely because he is a Christian.

Party political offices
Preceded by Fay Boozman	Republican Party nominee for United States Senator from Arkansas (Class 3); 2004	Succeeded by John Boozman
Preceded by Winthrop Paul Rockefeller	Republican nominee for Lieutenant Governor of Arkansas; 2006	Succeeded by Mark Darr
