= 2006 Arkansas gubernatorial election =

- November 7, 2006
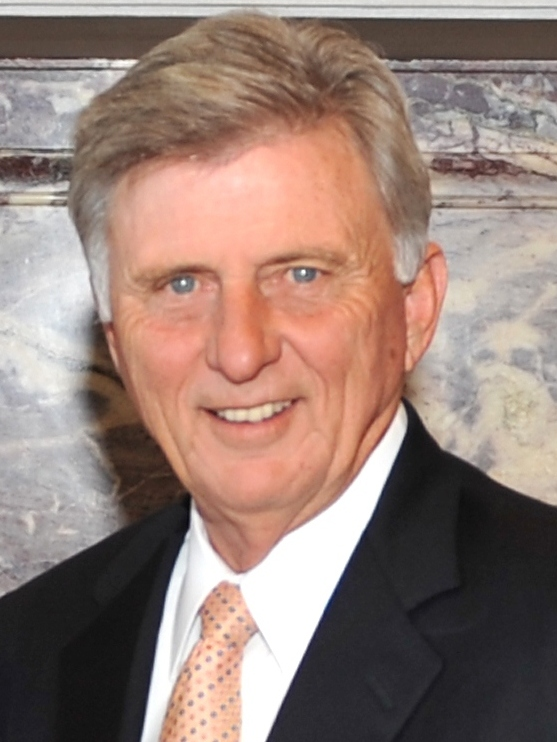

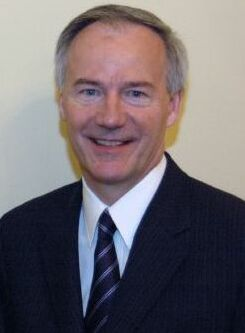
Nominee	Mike Beebe	Asa Hutchinson
Party	Democratic	Republican
Popular vote	430,765	315,040
Percentage	55.61%	40.67%
- Beebe: 40–50% 50–60% 60–70% 70–80% Hutchinson: 40–50% 50–60%
Governor before election
Mike Huckabee
Republican
Elected Governor
Mike Beebe
Democratic

The 2006 Arkansas gubernatorial election took place on Tuesday, November 7, 2006. Incumbent Republican governor Mike Huckabee was barred from seeking candidacy due to term limits set by the State Constitution in 1998, stating that the governor may only serve two terms in their lifetime. Democratic State Attorney General Mike Beebe defeated Republican former U.S. representative Asa Hutchinson by a wide margin. This was the first open seat election since 1978. Hutchinson later served as Arkansas’ Governor from 2015 to 2023.

== Democratic primary ==
=== Nominee ===
- Mike Beebe, Arkansas Attorney General

== Republican primary ==
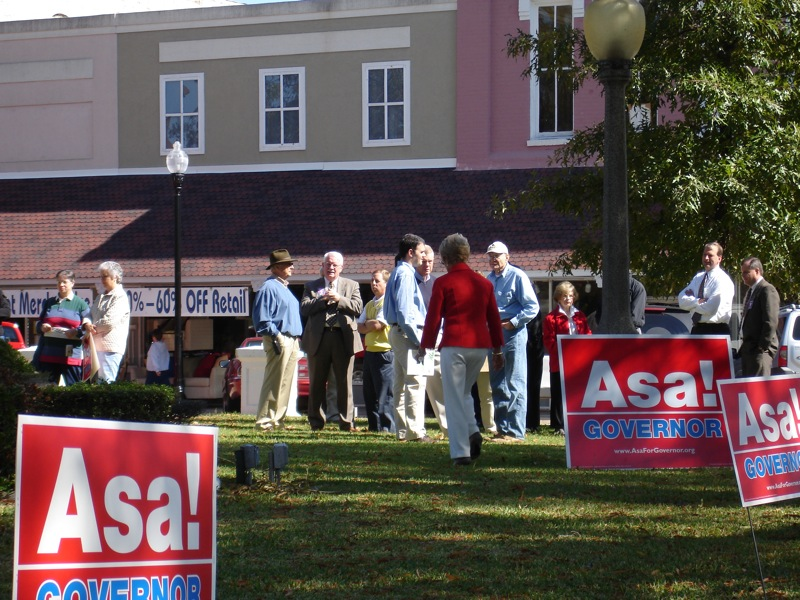
Hutchinson campaigning for governor in 2006

=== Candidates ===
- Asa Hutchinson, former administrator of the Drug Enforcement Administration, former U.S. representative from Arkansas's 3rd congressional district (1997–2001)

==== Withdrew ====
- Winthrop Paul Rockefeller, Lieutenant Governor (withdrew July 20, 2005 following blood cancer diagnosis; died July 16, 2006)

== Independents ==
=== Declared ===
- Rod Bryan, bass player for Ho-Hum and owner of Anthro-Pop Records

== General election ==
=== Debates ===
2006 Arkansas gubernatorial election debates
No.	Date	Host	Moderator	Link	Republican	Democratic
Key: P Participant A Absent N Not invited I Invited W Withdrawn						
Key: P Participant A Absent N Not invited I Invited W Withdrawn					Asa Hutchinson	Mike Beebe
1	Oct. 4, 2006	KEZA; KHBS; KHOG; Morning News of Northwest Arkansas	Craig Cannon	C-SPAN	P	P
2	Oct. 17, 2006	KARK-TV; William J. Clinton Presidential Library and Museum	Bob Clausen	C-SPAN	P	P

=== Predictions ===
Source	Ranking	As of
The Cook Political Report	Lean D (flip)	November 6, 2006
Inside Elections	Likely D (flip)	November 2, 2006
Sabato's Crystal Ball	Likely D (flip)	November 6, 2006
Real Clear Politics	Lean D (flip)	November 6, 2006

=== Polling ===
Poll source	Date(s) administered	Sample size	Margin of error	Asa Hutchinson (R)	Mike Beebe (D)	Other	Undecided
SurveyUSA	November 3–5, 2006	549	± 4.3%	42%	51%	4%	3%
SurveyUSA	October 22–24, 2006	572	± 4.1%	38%	58%	3%	1%
SurveyUSA	September 25–26, 2006	493	± 4.5%	40%	55%	3%	2%
SurveyUSA	August 27–29, 2006	538	± 4.3%	38%	51%	0%	7%
SurveyUSA	July 14–16, 2006	509	± 4.4%	38%	48%	—	13%
SurveyUSA	January 22–23, 2006	506	± 4.4%	45%	46%	4%	5%
SurveyUSA	December 3–5, 2005	684	± 3.8%	44%	49%	4%	3%

=== Endorsements ===
Mike Beebe (D)

Individuals

- Wesley Clark, 2004 Democratic presidential candidate

=== Results ===
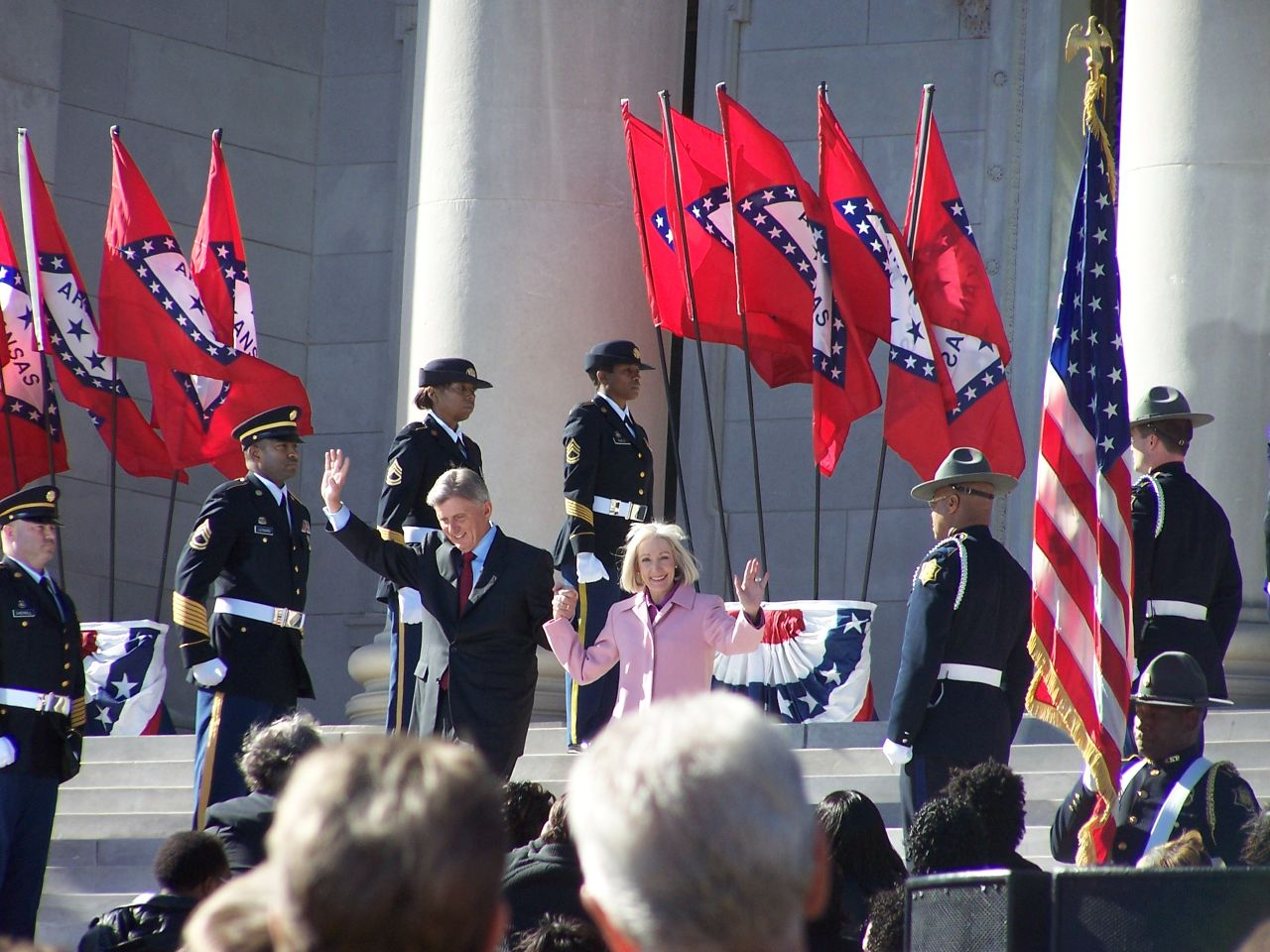
Mike Beebe is inaugurated as governor of Arkansas.

Arkansas gubernatorial election, 2006
Party	Candidate	Votes	%	±%
Democratic	Mike Beebe	430,765	55.61%	+8.65%
Republican	Asa Hutchinson	315,040	40.67%	−12.35%
Independent	Rod Bryan	15,767	2.04%	N/A
Green	Jim Lendall	12,774	1.65%	N/A
Write-in		334	0.04%	N/A
Total votes		774,680	100.00%	N/A
Democratic gain from Republican				

==== By county ====
County	Mike Beebe Democratic		Asa Hutchinson Republican		Rod Bryan Independent		Various candidates Other parties		Margin		Total
County	#	%	#	%	#	%	#	%	#	%	Total
Arkansas	3,898	68.04%	1,639	28.61%	113	1.97%	79	1.38%	2,259	39.43%	5,729
Ashley	3,550	63.80%	1,737	31.22%	165	2.97%	112	2.01%	1,813	32.58%	5,564
Baxter	6,248	46.75%	6,440	48.19%	296	2.21%	381	2.85%	−192	−1.44%	13,365
Benton	18,811	38.66%	28,608	58.79%	671	1.38%	569	1.17%	−9,797	−20.13%	48,659
Boone	4,362	40.96%	5,784	54.31%	263	2.47%	240	2.25%	−1,422	−13.35%	10,649
Bradley	1,776	64.30%	862	31.21%	42	1.52%	82	2.97%	914	33.09%	2,762
Calhoun	1,001	57.07%	635	36.20%	67	3.82%	51	2.91%	366	20.87%	1,754
Carroll	3,881	47.08%	3,978	48.26%	134	1.63%	250	3.03%	−97	−1.18%	8,243
Chicot	2,570	74.71%	791	22.99%	51	1.48%	28	0.81%	1,779	51.72%	3,440
Clark	4,162	64.57%	2,024	31.40%	119	1.85%	141	2.19%	2,138	33.17%	6,446
Clay	3,010	68.77%	1,137	25.98%	142	3.24%	88	2.01%	1,873	42.79%	4,377
Cleburne	4,881	50.75%	4,370	45.44%	217	2.26%	150	1.56%	511	5.31%	9,618
Cleveland	1,450	56.49%	982	38.25%	76	2.96%	59	2.30%	468	18.23%	2,567
Columbia	3,379	55.93%	2,549	42.20%	68	1.13%	45	0.74%	830	13.74%	6,041
Conway	4,125	62.18%	2,268	34.19%	130	1.96%	111	1.67%	1,857	27.99%	6,634
Craighead	12,753	61.09%	7,696	36.87%	267	1.28%	160	0.77%	5,057	24.22%	20,876
Crawford	7,249	45.33%	8,139	50.89%	344	2.15%	260	1.63%	−890	−5.57%	15,992
Crittenden	13,246	71.23%	5,023	27.01%	148	0.80%	180	0.97%	8,223	44.22%	18,597
Cross	3,331	61.74%	1,819	33.72%	138	2.56%	107	1.98%	1,512	28.03%	5,395
Dallas	1,774	62.89%	975	34.56%	36	1.28%	36	1.28%	799	28.32%	2,821
Desha	2,516	75.76%	703	21.17%	58	1.75%	44	1.32%	1,813	54.59%	3,321
Drew	2,556	61.89%	1,447	35.04%	72	1.74%	55	1.33%	1,109	26.85%	4,130
Faulkner	12,419	49.91%	11,506	46.24%	493	1.98%	465	1.87%	913	3.67%	24,883
Franklin	2,908	52.62%	2,452	44.37%	99	1.79%	67	1.21%	456	8.25%	5,526
Fulton	2,002	59.49%	1,199	35.63%	105	3.12%	59	1.75%	803	23.86%	3,365
Garland	15,482	52.34%	12,530	42.36%	837	2.83%	733	2.48%	2,952	9.98%	29,582
Grant	2,798	53.98%	2,186	42.18%	134	2.59%	65	1.25%	612	11.81%	5,183
Greene	5,724	62.20%	3,283	35.67%	117	1.27%	79	0.86%	2,441	26.52%	9,203
Hempstead	3,212	65.60%	1,566	31.99%	65	1.33%	53	1.08%	1,646	33.62%	4,896
Hot Spring	5,312	61.42%	3,012	34.83%	184	2.13%	140	1.62%	2,300	26.60%	8,648
Howard	2,090	64.21%	1,057	32.47%	65	2.00%	43	1.32%	1,033	31.74%	3,255
Independence	5,608	56.07%	3,934	39.33%	271	2.71%	189	1.89%	1,674	16.74%	10,002
Izard	2,412	58.05%	1,534	36.92%	113	2.72%	96	2.31%	878	21.13%	4,155
Jackson	3,189	70.09%	1,036	22.77%	209	4.59%	116	2.55%	2,153	47.32%	4,550
Jefferson	14,659	72.46%	4,955	24.49%	306	1.51%	311	1.54%	9,704	47.97%	20,231
Johnson	3,372	54.97%	2,410	39.29%	246	4.01%	106	1.73%	962	15.68%	6,134
Lafayette	1,684	66.61%	741	29.31%	69	2.73%	34	1.34%	943	37.30%	2,528
Lawrence	3,227	66.73%	1,400	28.95%	139	2.87%	70	1.45%	1,827	37.78%	4,836
Lee	2,233	76.13%	621	21.17%	29	0.99%	50	1.70%	1,612	54.96%	2,933
Lincoln	1,960	69.83%	757	26.97%	52	1.85%	38	1.35%	1,203	42.86%	2,807
Little River	2,552	67.57%	1,012	26.79%	119	3.15%	94	2.49%	1,540	40.77%	3,777
Logan	3,525	53.90%	2,794	42.72%	131	2.00%	90	1.38%	731	11.18%	6,540
Lonoke	7,768	48.35%	7,792	48.50%	282	1.76%	223	1.39%	−24	−0.15%	16,065
Madison	2,587	47.88%	2,650	49.05%	100	1.85%	66	1.22%	−63	−1.17%	5,403
Marion	2,810	46.45%	2,858	47.25%	218	3.60%	163	2.69%	−48	−0.79%	6,049
Miller	5,466	56.06%	3,933	40.33%	259	2.66%	93	0.95%	1,533	15.72%	9,751
Mississippi	7,119	69.96%	2,677	26.31%	154	1.51%	226	2.22%	4,442	43.65%	10,176
Monroe	1,914	69.42%	776	28.15%	36	1.31%	31	1.12%	1,138	41.28%	2,757
Montgomery	1,526	52.84%	1,207	41.79%	74	2.56%	81	2.80%	319	11.05%	2,888
Nevada	1,694	64.63%	811	30.94%	67	2.56%	49	1.87%	883	33.69%	2,621
Newton	1,519	43.30%	1,804	51.43%	88	2.51%	97	2.77%	−285	−8.12%	3,508
Ouachita	4,665	62.30%	2,647	35.35%	90	1.20%	86	1.15%	2,018	26.95%	7,488
Perry	1,918	52.63%	1,456	39.96%	145	3.98%	125	3.43%	462	12.68%	3,644
Phillips	4,934	71.34%	1,563	22.60%	160	2.31%	259	3.74%	3,371	48.74%	6,916
Pike	1,770	55.61%	1,317	41.38%	49	1.54%	47	1.48%	453	14.23%	3,183
Poinsett	4,346	69.45%	1,793	28.65%	71	1.13%	48	0.77%	2,553	40.80%	6,258
Polk	2,465	44.03%	2,831	50.56%	164	2.93%	139	2.48%	−366	−6.54%	5,599
Pope	6,847	44.67%	7,778	50.74%	348	2.27%	355	2.32%	−931	−6.07%	15,328
Prairie	1,901	66.03%	804	27.93%	105	3.65%	69	2.40%	1,097	38.10%	2,879
Pulaski	66,821	60.79%	38,653	35.16%	2,521	2.29%	1,933	1.76%	28,168	25.62%	109,928
Randolph	2,894	62.65%	1,403	30.37%	213	4.61%	109	2.36%	1,491	32.28%	4,619
Saline	14,754	46.17%	15,931	49.86%	677	2.12%	592	1.85%	−1,177	−3.68%	31,954
Scott	1,407	50.72%	1,230	44.34%	80	2.88%	57	2.05%	177	6.38%	2,774
Searcy	1,296	41.50%	1,629	52.16%	107	3.43%	91	2.91%	−333	−10.66%	3,123
Sebastian	14,971	47.11%	16,142	50.80%	377	1.19%	288	0.91%	−1,171	−3.68%	31,778
Sevier	1,959	64.82%	956	31.63%	57	1.89%	50	1.65%	1,003	33.19%	3,022
Sharp	3,159	56.55%	2,021	36.18%	321	5.75%	85	1.52%	1,138	20.37%	5,586
St. Francis	4,939	71.53%	1,769	25.62%	110	1.59%	87	1.26%	3,170	45.91%	6,905
Stone	2,270	50.87%	1,956	43.84%	130	2.91%	106	2.38%	314	7.04%	4,462
Union	6,057	52.95%	5,222	45.65%	96	0.84%	64	0.56%	835	7.30%	11,439
Van Buren	3,007	54.45%	2,202	39.87%	158	2.86%	156	2.82%	805	14.58%	5,523
Washington	22,836	50.70%	20,930	46.47%	538	1.19%	733	1.63%	1,906	4.23%	45,037
White	11,670	55.59%	8,653	41.22%	365	1.74%	305	1.45%	3,017	14.37%	20,993
Woodruff	1,907	76.40%	473	18.95%	40	1.60%	76	3.04%	1,434	57.45%	2,496
Yell	2,672	59.19%	1,582	35.05%	167	3.70%	93	2.06%	1,090	24.15%	4,514
TOTALS	430,765	55.61%	315,040	40.67%	15,767	2.04%	13,108	1.69%	115,725	14.94%	774,680

==== Counties that flipped from Republican to Democratic ====
- Arkansas (Largest city: Stuttgart)
- Calhoun (Largest city: Hampton)
- Cleburne (Largest city: Heber Springs)
- Cleveland (Largest city: Rison)
- Columbia (Largest city: Magnolia)
- Franklin (Largest city: Ozark)
- Garland (Largest city: Hot Springs)
- Grant (Largest city: Sheridan)
- Howard (Largest city: Nashville)
- Independence (Largest city: Batesville)
- Johnson (Largest city: Clarksville)
- Logan (Largest city: Booneville)
- Miller (Largest city: Texarkana)
- Montgomery (Largest city: Mount Ida)
- Perry (Largest city: Perryville)
- Pike (Largest city: Glenwood)
- Prairie (Largest city: Des Arc)
- Scott (Largest city: Waldron)
- Sharp (Largest city: Cherokee Village)
- Stone (Largest city: Mountain View)
- Union (Largest city: El Dorado)
- Van Buren (Largest city: Clinton)
- Washington (Largest city: Fayetteville)
- White (Largest city: Searcy)
- Yell (Largest city: Dardanelle)
- Cross (Largest city: Wynne)
- Faulkner (Largest city: Conway)
- Drew (Largest city: Monticello)
