= 2006 Arkansas elections =

Arkansas's 2006 state elections were held November 7, 2006. Primaries were held May 23 and runoffs, if necessary, were held June 13. Arkansas elected seven constitutional officers, 17 of 35 state senate seats, all 100 house seats and 28 district prosecuting attorneys, and voted on one constitutional amendment and one referred question. Non-partisan judicial elections were held the same day as the party primaries for four Supreme Court justices, four appeals circuit court judges, and eight district court judges.

In the 2006 general election in Arkansas, Democratic candidates won all statewide executive offices, majorities in both state legislative chambers, and 3 out of 4 U.S. House seats.

== Governor ==
=== Democrat ===
- Mike Beebe - Attorney General

=== Republican ===
- Asa Hutchinson - former Undersecretary of Homeland Security

=== Green Party ===
- Jim Lendall (ran for Governor 2006 - former state representative)

=== Third Parties ===
- Rod Bryan (independent) - musician

== Lieutenant governor ==
=== Democratic primary ===
- Bill Halter - former Social Security commissioner
- Tim Wooldridge - state senator, District 11
- Mike Hathorn - former state representative, Arkansas Rural Development Commissioner
- Jay Martin - state representative, North Little Rock

Halter came in first in the Democratic primary:

Lt. Governor - Democratic Primary
Candidate	Votes	%
Bill Halter	110,797	40
Tim Wooldridge	73,718	26.6
Mike Hathorn	68,531	24.7
Jay Martin	24,174	8.7

=== Democratic Run-off ===
Halter also won the run-off:

Lt. Governor - Democratic Run-off
Candidate	Votes	%
Bill Halter	97,279	56.5
Tim Wooldridge	74,906	43.5

=== Republican primary ===
- Jim Holt - state senator, District 35
- Charles "Chuck" Banks - former US Attorney
- Douglas Jay Matayo - state representative, Springdale

Holt won the primary:

Lt. Governor - Republican Primary
Candidate	Votes	%
Jim Holt	35,309	56.2
Charles Banks	15,722	25
Douglas Jay Matayo	11,837	18.8

== Secretary of State ==
=== Democrat ===
- Charlie Daniels - incumbent

=== Republican ===
- Jim Lagrone - businessman, former Baptist pastor

=== Green Party ===
- Ralph "Marty" Scully - retiree, former Teamster

Results by county Daniels: 50–60%; 60–70%; 70–80%; 80–90%; Lagrone: 50–60%

== Attorney general ==
2006 Arkansas Attorney General election
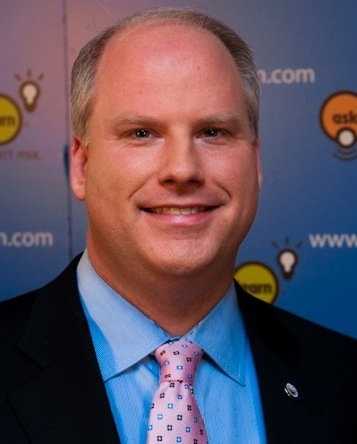

Nominee	Dustin McDaniel	Gunner DeLay
Party	Democratic	Republican
Popular vote	443,476	281,598
Percentage	58.4%	37.1%
- County results McDaniel: 40–50% 50–60% 60–70% 70–80% 80–90% DeLay: 40–50% 50–60%
Attorney General before election
Mike Beebe
Democratic
Elected Attorney General
Dustin McDaniel
Democratic

=== Democratic primary ===
- Dustin McDaniel - State Representative, District 75 (Jonesboro), former attorney.
- Paul Suskie - North Little Rock City Attorney, Afghanistan Conflict veteran.
- Robert Leo Herzfeld - Saline County Prosecutor.

McDaniel came in first:

Attorney General - Democratic Primary
Candidate	Votes	%
Dustin McDaniel	104,328	38.4
Paul Suskie	87,017	32
Robert Leo Herzfeld	80,437	29.6

=== Democratic Run-off ===
McDaniel also won the run-off, with exactly 87,000 votes:

Attorney General - Democratic Run-off
Candidate	Votes	%
Dustin McDaniel	87,000	50.8
Paul Suskie	84,334	49.2

=== Republican ===
- Gunner DeLay - former state senator, attorney

=== Green Party ===
Rebekah Kennedy - civil rights attorney and Public Relations chair for the Green Party of Arkansas

== Auditor of State ==
=== Democrat ===
- Jim Wood - incumbent

=== Green Party ===
- Michael Bolzenius - advertising salesman

Results by county Wood: 70–80%; 80–90%; 90–100%

== State Treasurer ==
=== Democratic primary ===
- Martha Shoffner - former state representative, 2002 auditor candidate
- Mac Campbell - tax attorney, former counsel to Senator Blanche Lincoln
- Don House - businessman, state representative (Walnut Ridge)

Shoffner lead solidly, but not enough to avoid a run-off:

State Treasurer - Democratic Primary
Candidate	Votes	%
Martha Shoffner	115,582	43.8
Mac Campbell	94,826	35.9
Don House	53,526	20.3

=== Democratic Run-off ===
Shoffner won the run-off:

State Treasurer - Democratic Run-off
Candidate	Votes	%
Martha Shoffner	91,081	54.1
Mac Campbell	77,293	45.9

=== Republican ===
- Chris Morris - staffer for Governor Mike Huckabee

=== Green Party ===
- Brock Carpenter - student, Hendrix College

Results by county Shoffner: 40–50%; 50–60%; 60–70%; 70–80%; 80–90%; Morris: 40–50%; 50–60%

== Commissioner of State Lands ==
=== Democrat ===
- Mark Wilcox - incumbent

=== Green Party ===
- R. David Lewis - attorney

== Judicial Elections ==
Judicial elections are nonpartisan.

=== Supreme Court ===
Four Supreme Court associate justices were up for reelection to eight-year terms.

==== Position 2 ====
- Donald Louis Corbin - incumbent
- Roger Harrod - Maumelle district court judge

Supreme Court Position 2 Results	Votes	Percentage
Donald Louis Corbin	193,625	62.8
Roger Harrod	114,957	37.3
Total	308,582	100

==== Position 5 ====
- Paul Danielson - circuit judge for the 15th circuit
- Wendell Griffen - appeals judge, District 6

Supreme Court Position 5 Results	Votes	Percentage
Paul Danielson	177,406	57.2
Wendell Griffen	132,789	42.8
Total	310,195	100

==== Position 6 ====
- Annabelle Clinton Imber - incumbent. Uncontested for reelection.

==== Position 7 ====
- Robert Brown - incumbent. Uncontested for reelection.

=== Court of Appeals ===
Elections were held on primary election day for four appeals judges to new eight-year terms. All candidates stood unopposed and were reelected by acclamation:

- Judge John Pittman - District 1, Position 1
- Denzil Price Marshall - District 1, Position 2
- Judge Terry Crabtree - District 3, Position 2
- Judge Larry Vaught - District 6, Position 2

=== Circuit Courts ===
Elections were also held on primary election day for eight district court judges, for six-year terms. Necessary run-offs will be held with the general election.

- Unopposed:
  - Judge John Mark Lindsay - District 4, Division 6
  - Judge Ellen Brantley - District 6, Division 16, Subdistrict 6.2
  - Judge Mackie Pierce - District 6, Division 17, Subdistrict 6.2

District 2, Division 7, At-Large	Votes	Percentage
Barbara Halsey	15,417	48.5
Raymond Spruell	8,476	26.7
Alan Seagrave	7,881	24.8
Total	31,774	100

District 8-North, Division 1	Votes	Percentage
William Randal Wright	4,094	66
Mark Gunter	2,108	34
Total	6,202	100

District 11-West, Division 2	Votes	Percentage
Robert Wyatt	4,874	50.2
Wilson Bynum	4,840	49.8
Total	9,714	100

District 18-East, Division 4	Votes	Percentage
Judge Marcia Renaud Hearnsberger	6,884	53.9
Latt Bachelor	5,887	46.1
Total	12,771	100

== General Assembly Elections ==
=== State Senate ===
17 senators are up for reelection to four-year terms.

Arkansas State Senate	Members
Republican-Held	8
Democrat-Held	27
Elections, 2006
Republican Held and Uncontested	8
Contested	3
Democratic Held and Uncontested	24
Total	35

=== State House ===
All 100 House seats are up for re-election.

Arkansas State House	Members
Republican-Held	29
Democrat-Held	71
Elections, 2006
Uncontested Republican	20
Contested	32
Uncontested Democratic	48
Total	100

== Referendums ==
- Constitutional Amendment 1: would amend the Arkansas Constitution to lift prohibitions against gambling from bingos and lotteries conducted by authorized nonprofit organizations, such as churches or volunteer fire organizations.
- Referred Question 1: would allow the state to issue no more than $250 million in bonds to finance the development of technology and facilities for state institutions of higher education.
