= 2014 United States House of Representatives elections in Arkansas =

- November 4, 2014

All 4 Arkansas seats to the United States House of Representatives
	Majority party	Minority party	Third party
Party	Republican	Democratic	Libertarian
Last election	4	0	0
Seats won	4	0	0
Seat change	Steady	Steady	Steady
Popular vote	509,631	254,774	66,055
Percentage	61.35%	30.67%	7.95%
Swing	▼0.07%	▲1.31%	▲4.29%

Republican
40–50%
50–60%
60–70%
70–80%
80–90%
Democratic
40–50%
50–60%
60–70%

The 2014 United States House of Representatives elections in Arkansas was held on Tuesday, November 4, 2014, to elect the four U.S. representatives from the state of Arkansas, one from each of the state's four congressional districts. The elections coincided with the elections of other federal and state offices, including the governor of Arkansas and a United States senator.

== Overview ==
=== Statewide ===
The table below shows the total number and percentage of votes, as well as the number of seats gained and lost by each political party in the election for the United States House of Representatives in Arkansas.

United States House of Representatives elections in Arkansas, 2014
Party	Votes	Percentage	Seats	+/–
Republican	509,631	61.4%	4	-
Democratic	254,774	30.7%	0	-
Libertarian	66,055	8.0%	0	-
Write-ins	192	<0.1%	0	-
Totals	830,652	100%	4	—

Popular vote
Republican	61.35%
Democratic	30.67%
Libertarian	7.95%
Other	0.03%

House seats
Republican	100.0%
Democratic	0%
Libertarian	0%

=== By district ===
Results of the 2014 United States House of Representatives elections in Arkansas by district:

District	Republican		Democratic		Libertarian		Others		Total		Result
District	Votes	%	Votes	%	Votes	%	Votes	%	Votes	%	Result
District 1	124,139	63.25%	63,555	32.38%	8,562	4.36%	0	0.00%	196,256	100.0%	Republican Hold
District 2	123,073	51.86%	103,477	43.60%	10,590	4.46%	190	0.08%	237,330	100.0%	Republican Hold
District 3	151,630	79.41%	0	0.00%	39,305	20.59%	0	0.00%	190,935	100.0%	Republican Hold
District 4	110,789	53.75%	87,742	42.57%	7,598	3.69%	2	0.00%	206,131	100.0%	Republican Hold
Total	509,631	61.35%	254,774	30.67%	66,247	7.98%	192	0.03%	830,652	100.0%	

== District 1 ==
2014 Arkansas's 1st congressional district election
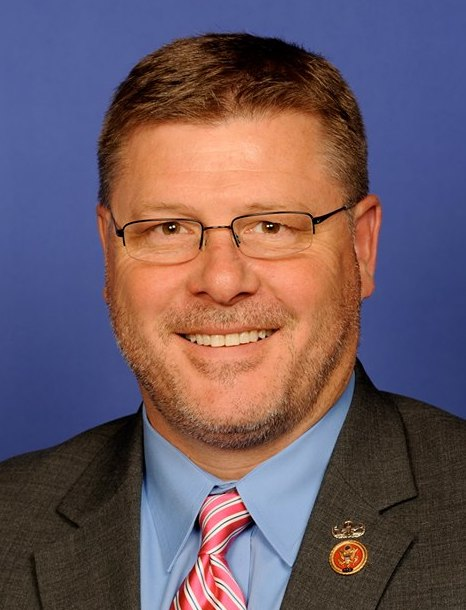

Nominee	Rick Crawford	Jackie McPherson
Party	Republican	Democratic
Popular vote	124,139	63,555
Percentage	63.3%	32.4%
- County results Crawford: 50–60% 60–70% 70–80% McPherson: 40–50% 50–60% 60–70%
U.S. Representative before election
Rick Crawford
Republican
Elected U.S. Representative
Rick Crawford
Republican

Incumbent Republican Rick Crawford, who had represented the district since 2011, was re-elected with 56% of the vote in 2012. The district had a PVI of R+14.

=== Republican primary ===
==== Candidates ====
===== Nominee =====
- Rick Crawford, incumbent U.S. Representative

===== Declined =====
- Linda Collins-Smith, former state representative (ran for the state senate)

=== Democratic primary ===
Democrats hoped to find a strong challenger to take on Crawford.

==== Candidates ====
===== Nominee =====
- Jackie McPherson, Mayor of Heber Springs

===== Declined =====
- Glen Fenter, president of Mid-South Community College
- Keith Ingram, State Senator
- Joe Jett, State Representative
- Dustin McDaniel, Arkansas Attorney General
- Harold Perrin, Mayor of Jonesboro
- Ben Ponder, candidate for AR-01 in 2010
- Chris Thyer, United States Attorney for the Eastern District of Arkansas
- Zac White, attorney
- Marshall Wright, state representative

=== Libertarian nomination ===
==== Candidates ====
===== Nominee =====
- Brian Scott Willhite

=== General election ===
==== Predictions ====
Source	Ranking	As of
The Cook Political Report	Safe R	November 3, 2014
Rothenberg	Safe R	October 24, 2014
Sabato's Crystal Ball	Safe R	October 30, 2014
RCP	Safe R	November 2, 2014
Daily Kos Elections	Safe R	November 4, 2014

==== Endorsements ====
Rick Crawford (R)

Organizations

- National Federation of Independent Business
- National Rifle Association - Political Victory Fund
- National Right to Life Committee
Jackie McPherson (D)

Labor unions

- AFL-CIO

Organizations

- Democratic Congressional Campaign Committee "Emerging Races" Program

==== Polling ====
Poll source	Date(s) administered	Sample size	Margin of error	Rick Crawford (R)	Jackie McPherson (D)	Brian Scott Willhite (L)	Undecided
New York Times/CBS News Battleground Tracker	October 16–23, 2014	273	± 9.0%	59%	29%	0%	11%
Talk Business/Hendrix	October 15–16, 2014	437	± 4.7%	52%	30%	4%	14%
Talk Business/Hendrix	July 22–25, 2014	450	± 4.6%	47%	33%	3%	17%

==== Results ====
2014 Arkansas's 1st congressional district election
Party	Candidate	Votes	%
Republican	Rick Crawford (incumbent)	124,139	63.3
Democratic	Jackie McPherson	63,555	32.4
Libertarian	Brian Scott Willhite	8,562	4.4
Total votes		196,256	100.0
Republican hold			

==== By county ====
County	Rick Crawford Republican		Jackie McPherson Democratic		Brian Scott Willhite Libertarian		Margin		Total
County	#	%	#	%	#	%	#	%	Total
Arkansas	3,089	61.97%	1,739	34.88%	157	3.15%	1,350	27.08%	4,985
Baxter	10,756	72.71%	3,299	22.30%	738	4.99%	7,457	50.41%	14,793
Chicot	1,308	37.89%	2,052	59.44%	92	2.67%	-744	-21.55%	3,452
Clay	2,736	69.14%	1,052	26.59%	169	4.27%	1,684	42.56%	3,957
Cleburne	6,329	64.46%	3,048	31.05%	441	4.49%	3,281	33.42%	9,818
Craighead	17,473	69.38%	6,572	26.09%	1,140	4.53%	10,901	43.28%	25,185
Crittenden	5,034	48.04%	5,164	49.28%	281	2.68%	-130	-1.24%	10,479
Cross	3,395	65.18%	1,651	31.70%	163	3.13%	1,744	33.48%	5,209
Desha	1,365	42.18%	1,761	54.42%	110	3.40%	-396	-12.24%	3,236
Fulton	2,159	65.05%	1,016	30.61%	144	4.34%	1,143	34.44%	3,319
Greene	7,887	72.07%	2,613	23.88%	444	4.06%	5,274	48.19%	10,944
Independence	7,009	67.80%	2,846	27.53%	482	4.66%	4,163	40.27%	10,337
Izard	2,818	65.84%	1,214	28.36%	248	5.79%	1,604	37.48%	4,280
Jackson	2,480	60.86%	1,426	34.99%	169	4.15%	1,054	25.87%	4,075
Jefferson (part)	108	28.50%	255	67.28%	16	4.22%	-147	-38.79%	379
Lawrence	3,124	68.95%	1,187	26.20%	220	4.86%	1,937	42.75%	4,531
Lee	1,040	40.39%	1,449	56.27%	86	3.34%	-409	-15.88%	2,575
Lincoln	1,681	55.83%	1,208	40.12%	122	4.05%	473	15.71%	3,011
Lonoke	14,016	73.37%	4,137	21.66%	951	4.98%	9,879	51.71%	19,104
Mississippi	5,467	54.75%	4,108	41.14%	410	4.11%	1,359	13.61%	9,985
Monroe	1,172	50.45%	1,015	43.69%	136	5.85%	157	6.76%	2,323
Phillips	2,129	37.92%	3,313	59.01%	172	3.06%	-1,184	-21.09%	5,614
Poinsett	4,317	68.44%	1,710	27.11%	281	4.45%	2,607	41.33%	6,308
Prairie	1,688	64.72%	766	29.37%	154	5.90%	922	35.35%	2,608
Randolph	3,219	64.72%	1,466	29.47%	289	5.81%	1,753	35.24%	4,974
Searcy (part)	2,063	74.05%	570	20.46%	153	5.49%	1,493	53.59%	2,786
Sharp	3,945	70.60%	1,363	24.39%	280	5.01%	2,582	46.21%	5,588
St. Francis	2,408	41.00%	3,299	56.17%	166	2.83%	-891	-15.17%	5,873
Stone	2,964	66.95%	1,222	27.60%	241	5.44%	1,742	39.35%	4,427
Woodruff	960	45.69%	1,034	49.21%	107	5.09%	-74	-3.52%	2,101
Totals	124,139	63.25%	63,555	32.38%	8,562	4.36%	60,584	30.87%	196,256

== District 2 ==
2014 Arkansas's 2nd congressional district election
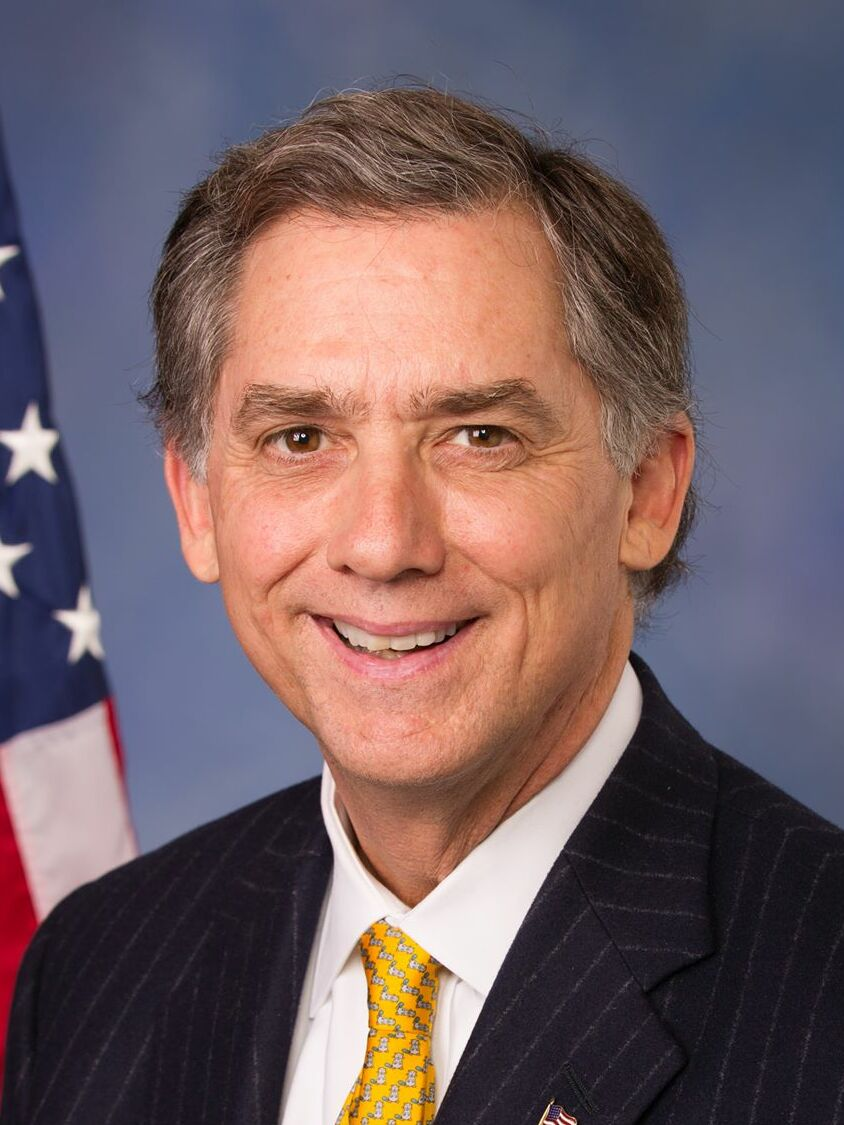

Nominee	French Hill	Pat Hays
Party	Republican	Democratic
Popular vote	123,073	103,477
Percentage	51.9%	43.6%
- County results Hill: 50–60% 60–70% Hays: 50–60%
U.S. Representative before election
Tim Griffin
Republican
Elected U.S. Representative
French Hill
Republican

Incumbent Republican Tim Griffin, who had represented the district since 2011, announced in October 2013 that he would not run for re-election in 2014. In January, he announced that he was running for Lieutenant Governor of Arkansas. He was re-elected with 55% of the vote in 2012. The district had a PVI of R+8.

=== Republican primary ===
==== Candidates ====
===== Nominee =====
- French Hill, businessman and former White House aide for President George H. W. Bush

===== Eliminated in primary =====
- Ann Clemmer, state representative
- Conrad Reynolds, retired U.S. Army Colonel and candidate for Senate in 2010

===== Declined =====
- Gilbert Baker, former state senator and candidate for U.S. Senate in 2010
- Jonathan Dismang, state senator
- Lanny Fite, Saline County Judge
- Ed Garner, former state representative
- Tim Griffin, incumbent U.S. Representative
- Jeremy Hutchinson, state senator
- Allen Kerr, state representative
- Andy Mayberry, state representative
- Jason Rapert, state senator
- David J. Sanders, state senator

==== Polling ====
Poll source	Date(s) administered	Sample size	Margin of error	Ann Clemmer	French Hill	Conrad Reynolds	Undecided
Talk Business/Hendrix College	April 29, 2014	360	± 5.1%	7%	59%	14%	20%

==== Results ====
Republican primary results
Party	Candidate	Votes	%
Republican	French Hill	29,916	55.1
Republican	Ann Clemmer	12,400	22.8
Republican	Conrad Reynolds	11,994	22.1
Total votes		54,310	100.0

=== Democratic primary ===
==== Candidates ====
===== Nominee =====
- Pat Hays, former mayor of North Little Rock

===== Declined =====
- Will Bond, former chair of the Democratic Party of Arkansas
- Shane Broadway, interim director of the Arkansas Department of Higher Education and former state senator
- Dianne Curry, former Little Rock School Board President
- John Charles Edwards, state representative
- Bill Halter, former Lieutenant Governor of Arkansas and candidate for U.S. Senate in 2010
- David Johnson, state senator
- Chris Massingill, chairman of the Delta Regional Authority
- Franklin McLarty, businessman and former chair of the Arkansas Economic Development Commission
- Tommy Thompson, state representative
- Tab Townsell, Mayor of Conway
- Linda Tyler, businesswoman and former state representative

=== Libertarian nomination ===
==== Candidates ====
===== Nominee =====
- Debbie Standiford

=== General election ===
==== Endorsements ====
French Hill (R)

Organizations

- National Republican Congressional Committee "Young Guns" Program
- National Rifle Association - Political Victory Fund
- National Right to Life Committee
Pat Hays (D)

Labor unions

- AFL-CIO
- National Association of Letter Carriers

Organizations

- Democratic Congressional Campaign Committee "Red to Blue" Program

==== Polling ====
Poll source	Date(s) administered	Sample size	Margin of error	French Hill (R)	Pat Hays (D)	Debbie Standiford (L)	Undecided
New York Times/CBS News Battleground Tracker	October 16–23, 2014	475	± 7.0%	41%	40%	0%	19%
Talk Business/Hendrix	October 15–16, 2014	605	± 4.0%	41%	46%	5%	8%
Global Strategy Group (D-Hays)	September 7–9, 2014	410	± 4.8%	41%	44%	—	15%
Talk Business/Hendrix	July 22–25, 2014	483	± 4.5%	44%	43%	3%	10%

==== Predictions ====
Source	Ranking	As of
The Cook Political Report	Tossup	November 3, 2014
Rothenberg	Tossup	October 24, 2014
Sabato's Crystal Ball	Lean R	October 30, 2014
RCP	Tossup	November 2, 2014
Daily Kos Elections	Tossup	November 4, 2014

==== Results ====
2014 Arkansas's 2nd congressional district election
Party	Candidate	Votes	%
Republican	French Hill	123,073	51.9
Democratic	Pat Hays	103,477	43.6
Libertarian	Debbie Standiford	10,590	4.5
Write-in		190	0.1
Total votes		237,330	100.0
Republican hold			

==== By county ====
County	French Hill Republican		Pat Hays Democratic		Various candidates Other parties		Margin		Total
County	#	%	#	%	#	%	#	%	Total
Conway	3,290	52.39%	2,665	42.44%	325	5.18%	625	9.95%	6,280
Faulkner	20,213	60.06%	11,643	34.60%	1,798	5.34%	8,570	25.47%	33,654
Perry	2,056	58.00%	1,251	35.29%	238	6.71%	805	22.71%	3,545
Pulaski	53,252	41.97%	69,060	54.43%	4,563	3.60%	-15,808	-12.46%	126,875
Saline	25,607	64.92%	11,566	29.32%	2,268	5.75%	14,041	35.60%	39,441
Van Buren	3,570	60.98%	1,903	32.51%	381	6.51%	1,667	28.48%	5,854
White	15,085	69.58%	5,389	24.86%	1,207	5.57%	9,696	44.72%	21,681
Totals	123,073	51.86%	103,477	43.60%	10,780	4.54%	19,596	8.26%	237,330

== District 3 ==
2014 Arkansas's 3rd congressional district election
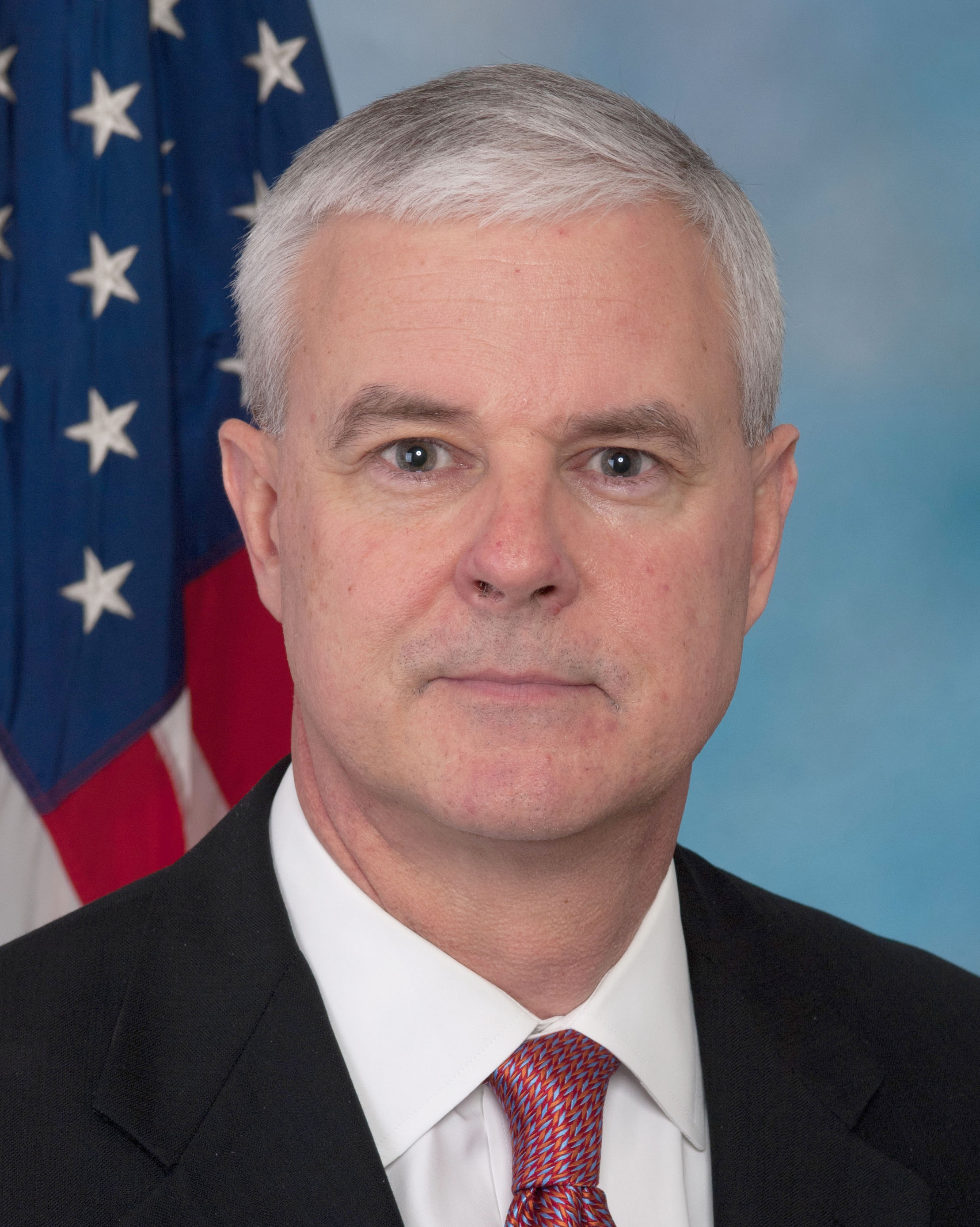

Nominee	Steve Womack	Grant Brand
Party	Republican	Libertarian
Popular vote	151,630	39,305
Percentage	79.4%	20.6%
- County results Womack: 70–80% 80–90% 90–100%
U.S. Representative before election
Steve Womack
Republican
Elected U.S. Representative
Steve Womack
Republican

Incumbent Republican Steve Womack, who had represented the district since 2011, ran for re-election. He was re-elected with 76% of the vote in 2012. The district had a PVI of R+19. Unlike the other Arkansas congressional districts, the 3rd has long had a Republican representative.

=== Republican primary ===
==== Candidates ====
===== Nominee =====
- Steve Womack, incumbent U.S. Representative

===== Declined =====
- Thomas Brewer, maths teacher and minister

=== Democratic primary ===
==== Candidates ====
===== Declined =====
- Troy Gittings, high school English teacher and stand-up comedian

=== Libertarian nomination ===
==== Candidates ====
===== Nominee =====
- Grant Brand

=== General election ===
==== Endorsements ====
Steve Womack (R)

Organizations

- National Federation of Independent Business
- National Rifle Association - Political Victory Fund

==== Polling ====
Poll source	Date(s) administered	Sample size	Margin of error	Steve Womack (R)	Grant Brand (L)	Undecided
New York Times/CBS News Battleground Tracker	October 16–23, 2014	460	± 7.0%	61%	20%	19%
Talk Business/Hendrix	October 15–16, 2014	426	± 4.7%	64%	19%	17%
Talk Business/Hendrix	July 22–25, 2014	408	± 4.9%	57%	20%	23%

==== Predictions ====
Source	Ranking	As of
The Cook Political Report	Safe R	November 3, 2014
Rothenberg	Safe R	October 24, 2014
Sabato's Crystal Ball	Safe R	October 30, 2014
RCP	Safe R	November 2, 2014
Daily Kos Elections	Safe R	November 4, 2014

==== Results ====
2014 Arkansas's 3rd congressional district election
Party	Candidate	Votes	%
Republican	Steve Womack (incumbent)	151,630	79.4
Libertarian	Grant Brand	39,305	20.6
Total votes		190,935	100.0
Republican hold			

==== By county ====
County	Steve Womack Republican		Grant Brand Libertarian		Margin		Total
County	#	%	#	%	#	%	Total
Benton	49,762	81.87%	11,021	18.13%	38,741	63.74%	60,783
Boone	8,697	82.66%	1,824	17.34%	6,873	65.33%	10,521
Carroll	5,581	72.31%	2,137	27.69%	3,444	44.62%	7,718
Crawford (part)	9,333	83.46%	1,849	16.54%	7,484	66.93%	11,182
Marion	3,945	81.97%	868	18.03%	3,077	63.93%	4,813
Newton (part)	930	82.59%	196	17.41%	734	65.19%	1,126
Pope	13,790	82.73%	2,878	17.27%	10,912	65.47%	16,668
Searcy (part)	144	91.72%	13	8.28%	131	83.44%	157
Sebastian (part)	21,285	80.75%	5,074	19.25%	16,211	61.50%	26,359
Washington	38,163	73.95%	13,445	26.05%	24,718	47.90%	51,608
Totals	151,630	79.41%	39,305	20.59%	112,325	58.83%	190,935

== District 4 ==
2014 Arkansas's 4th congressional district election
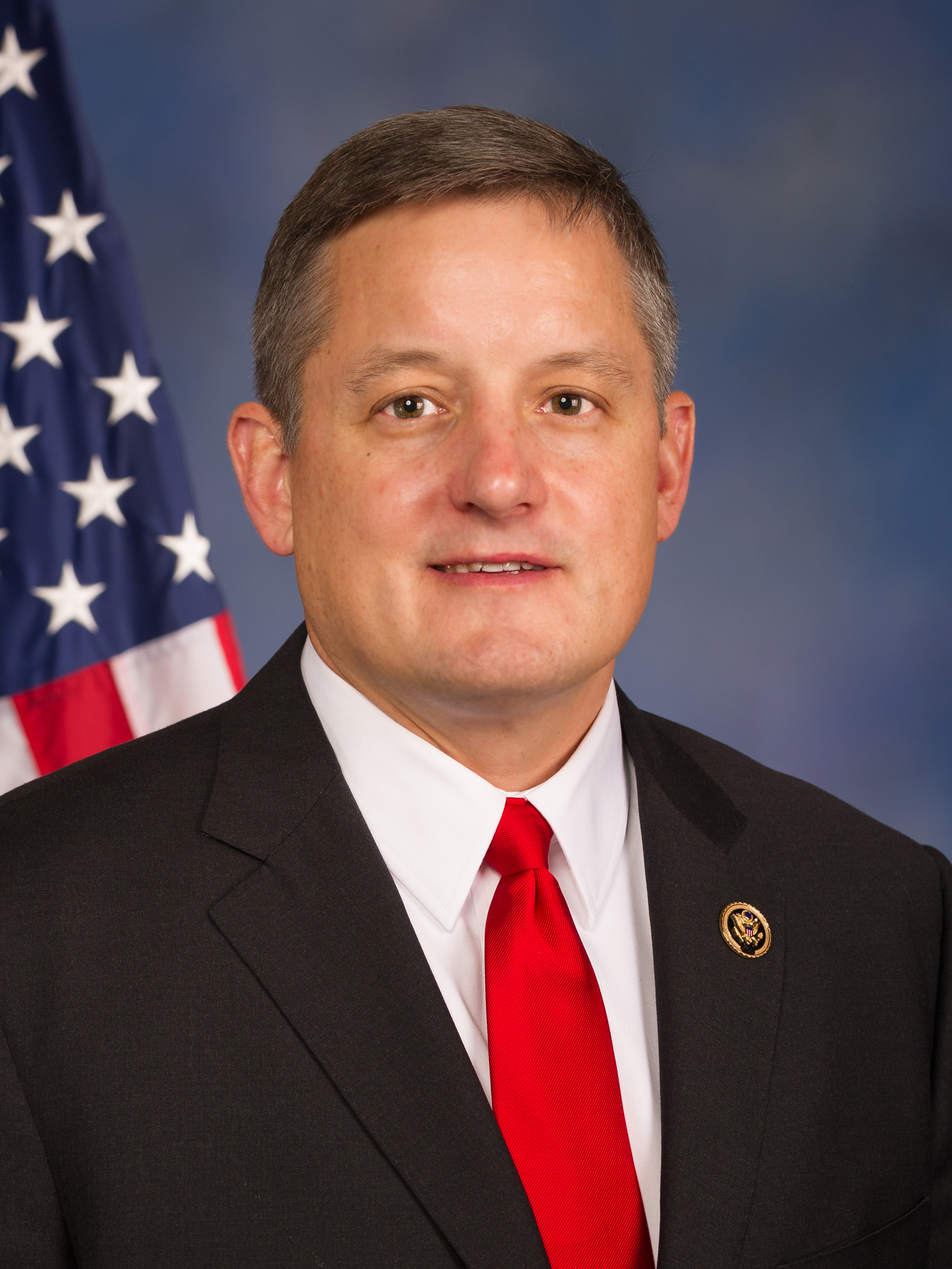

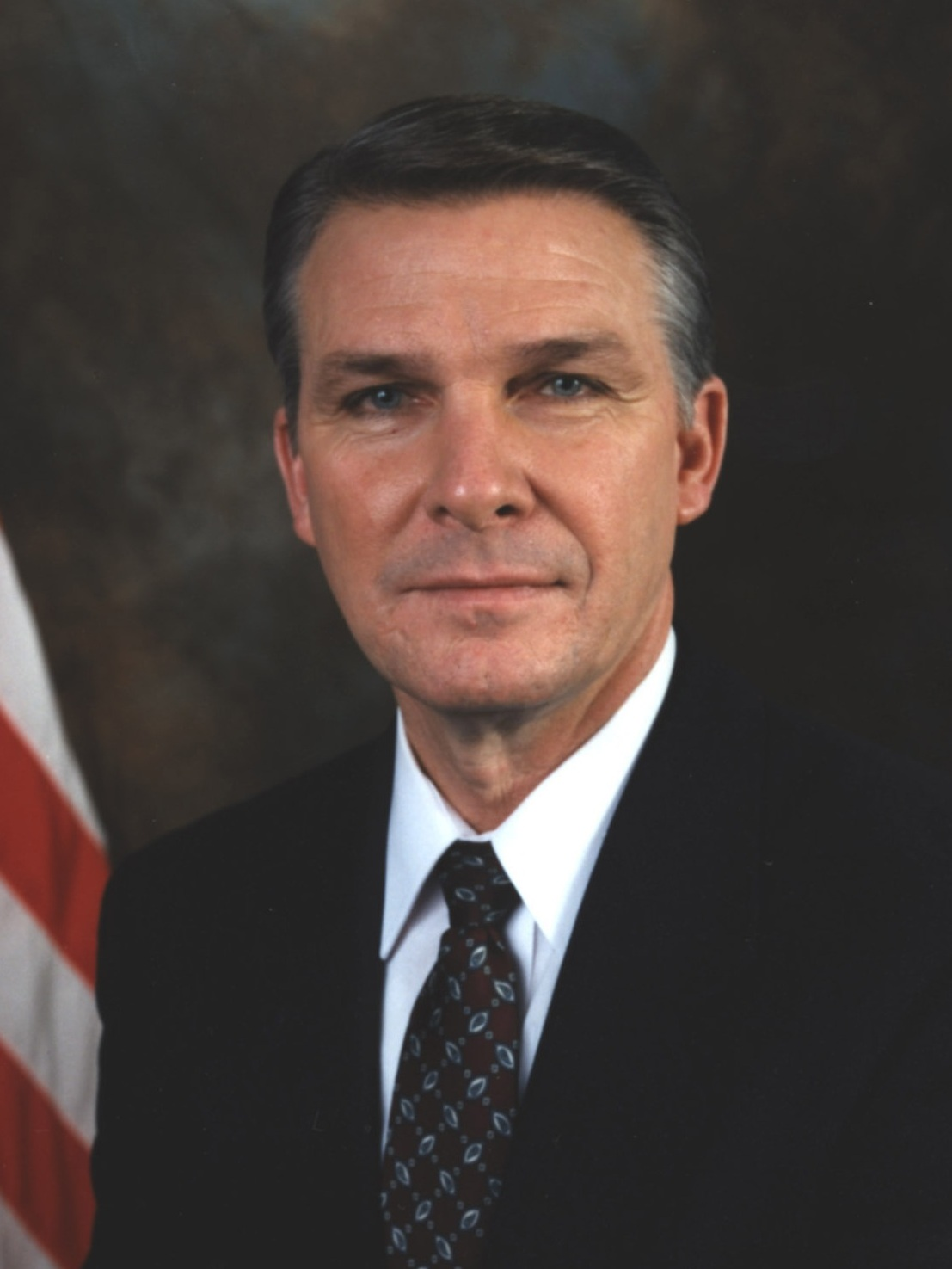
Nominee	Bruce Westerman	James Lee Witt
Party	Republican	Democratic
Popular vote	110,789	87,742
Percentage	53.7%	42.6%
- County results Westerman: 40–50% 50–60% 60–70% 70–80% Witt: 50–60% 60–70%
U.S. Representative before election
Tom Cotton
Republican
Elected U.S. Representative
Bruce Westerman
Republican

Incumbent Republican Tom Cotton, who had represented the district since 2013, announced he will not run for election to a second term in order to challenge Democratic incumbent Mark Pryor for his U.S. Senate seat. He was elected with 59% of the vote in 2012. The district had a PVI of R+15.

=== Republican primary ===
==== Candidates ====
===== Nominee =====
- Bruce Westerman, Majority Leader of the Arkansas House of Representatives

===== Eliminated in primary =====
- Tommy Moll, businessman

===== Withdrawn =====
- Mark Darr, Lieutenant Governor of Arkansas

===== Declined =====
- Nate Bell, state representative
- Tom Cotton, incumbent U.S. Representative
- Lane Jean, state representative
- Beth Anne Rankin, music teacher, former Miss Arkansas, nominee for this seat in 2010 and candidate in 2012
- Matthew Shepherd, state representative

==== Endorsements ====
Tommy Moll

Organizations

- FreedomWorks
Bruce Westerman

State legislators

- Alan Clark, state senator
- Bruce Cozart, state representative
- Richard Womack, state representative

Local officials

- Rick Davis, Garland County Judge

==== Polling ====
Poll source	Date(s) administered	Sample size	Margin of error	Tommy Moll	Bruce Westerman	Undecided
Talk Business/Hendrix College	April 29, 2014	392	± 4.9%	10%	47%	43%

==== Results ====
Republican primary results
Party	Candidate	Votes	%
Republican	Bruce Westerman	18,719	54.4
Republican	Tommy Moll	15,659	45.6
Total votes		34,378	100.0

=== Democratic primary ===
==== Candidates ====
===== Nominee =====
- James Lee Witt, former director of the Federal Emergency Management Agency

===== Withdrawn =====
- Janice Percefull, college instructor and author (running as write-in)

===== Declined =====
- Conner Eldridge, United States Attorney for the Western District of Arkansas
- Bruce Maloch, state senator
- Bobby Pierce, state senator
- Leslee Milam Post, former state representative
- Chris Thomason, chancellor of the University of Arkansas Community College at Hope and former state representative
- Jeff Wardlaw, state representative

=== Libertarian nomination ===
==== Candidates ====
===== Nominee =====
- Ken Hamilton

=== General election ===
==== Endorsements ====
Bruce Westerman (R)

State legislators

- Alan Clark, state senator
- Bruce Cozart, state representative
- Richard Womack, state representative

Organizations

- National Federation of Independent Business
- National Republican Congressional Committee "Young Guns" Program
- National Rifle Association - Political Victory Fund
- National Right to Life Committee

Local officials

- Rick Davis, Garland County Judge
James Lee Witt (D)

Labor unions

- AFL-CIO
- National Association of Letter Carriers

Organizations

- Blue Dog Coalition
- Democratic Congressional Campaign Committee "Red to Blue" Program

==== Polling ====
Poll source	Date(s) administered	Sample size	Margin of error	Bruce Westerman (R)	James Lee Witt (D)	Ken Hamilton (L)	Undecided
New York Times/CBS News Battleground Tracker	October 16–23, 2014	359	± 8.0%	34%	33%	5%	28%
Diamond State Consulting (R)	October 21, 2014	792	± 3.5%	46%	39%	2%	12%
Talk Business/Hendrix	October 15–16, 2014	607	± 4%	44%	42%	4%	10%
OnMessage (R-Westerman)	July 29–31, 2014	400	± 4.9%	47%	29%	7%	18%
Talk Business/Hendrix	July 22–25, 2014	439	± 4.7%	48%	34%	3%	15%

==== Predictions ====
Source	Ranking	As of
The Cook Political Report	Lean R	November 3, 2014
Rothenberg	Likely R	October 24, 2014
Sabato's Crystal Ball	Lean R	October 30, 2014
RCP	Lean R	November 2, 2014
Daily Kos Elections	Lean R	November 4, 2014

==== Results ====
2014 Arkansas's 4th congressional district election
Party	Candidate	Votes	%
Republican	Bruce Westerman	110,789	53.7
Democratic	James Lee Witt	87,742	42.6
Libertarian	Ken Hamilton	7,598	3.7
Write-in		2	0.0
Total votes		206,131	100.0
Republican hold			

==== By county ====
County	Bruce Westerman Republican		James Lee Witt Democratic		Various candidates Other parties		Margin		Total
County	#	%	#	%	#	%	#	%	Total
Ashley	3,166	51.78%	2,758	45.11%	190	3.11%	408	6.67%	6,114
Bradley	1,324	46.72%	1,417	50.00%	93	3.28%	-93	-3.28%	2,834
Calhoun	847	52.64%	711	44.19%	51	3.17%	136	8.45%	1,609
Clark	2,921	42.66%	3,755	54.84%	171	2.50%	-834	-12.18%	6,847
Cleveland	1,523	56.81%	1,057	39.43%	101	3.77%	466	17.38%	2,681
Columbia	4,265	55.45%	3,173	41.26%	253	3.29%	1,092	14.20%	7,691
Crawford (part)	3,078	67.44%	1,182	25.90%	304	6.66%	1,896	41.54%	4,564
Dallas	1,056	45.22%	1,229	52.63%	50	2.14%	-173	-7.41%	2,335
Drew	2,536	49.49%	2,444	47.70%	144	2.81%	92	1.80%	5,124
Franklin	3,187	58.71%	1,957	36.05%	284	5.23%	1,230	22.66%	5,428
Garland	19,029	62.29%	10,547	34.52%	975	3.19%	8,482	27.76%	30,551
Grant	3,258	61.52%	1,847	34.88%	191	3.61%	1,411	26.64%	5,296
Hempstead	2,860	54.25%	2,267	43.00%	145	2.75%	593	11.25%	5,272
Hot Spring	4,923	53.21%	3,896	42.11%	433	4.68%	1,027	11.10%	9,252
Howard	1,890	52.56%	1,608	44.72%	98	2.73%	282	7.84%	3,596
Jefferson (part)	5,797	30.11%	12,890	66.96%	564	2.93%	-7,093	-36.84%	19,251
Johnson	3,357	51.92%	2,764	42.75%	345	5.34%	593	9.17%	6,466
Lafayette	1,184	49.83%	1,144	48.15%	48	2.02%	40	1.68%	2,376
Little River	2,071	51.78%	1,793	44.83%	136	3.40%	278	6.95%	4,000
Logan	3,550	55.40%	2,565	40.03%	293	4.57%	985	15.37%	6,408
Madison	3,086	60.90%	1,738	34.30%	243	4.80%	1,348	26.60%	5,067
Miller	7,095	62.82%	3,919	34.70%	281	2.49%	3,176	28.12%	11,295
Montgomery	1,741	60.70%	1,020	35.56%	107	3.73%	721	25.14%	2,868
Nevada	1,211	44.72%	1,396	51.55%	101	3.73%	-185	-6.83%	2,708
Newton (part)	992	60.45%	544	33.15%	105	6.40%	448	27.30%	1,641
Ouachita	3,381	43.80%	4,019	52.06%	320	4.15%	-638	-8.26%	7,720
Pike	1,839	60.35%	1,105	36.27%	103	3.38%	734	24.09%	3,047
Polk	4,228	68.11%	1,637	26.37%	343	5.53%	2,591	41.74%	6,208
Scott	1,910	63.12%	960	31.73%	156	5.16%	950	31.39%	3,026
Sebastian (part)	2,931	72.14%	893	21.98%	239	5.88%	2,038	50.16%	4,063
Sevier	2,070	59.30%	1,295	37.10%	126	3.61%	775	22.20%	3,491
Union	6,777	55.88%	4,858	40.06%	492	4.06%	1,919	15.82%	12,127
Yell	1,706	32.97%	3,354	64.81%	115	2.22%	-1,648	-31.85%	5,175
Totals	110,789	53.75%	87,742	42.57%	7,600	3.69%	23,047	11.18%	206,131

== See also ==
- 2014 United States House of Representatives elections
- 2014 United States elections
