= 2012 United States House of Representatives elections in Arkansas =

- November 6, 2012

All 4 Arkansas seats to the United States House of Representatives
	Majority party	Minority party	Third party
Party	Republican	Democratic	Green
Last election	3	1	0
Seats won	4	0	0
Seat change	▲1	▼1	Steady
Popular vote	637,591	304,770	57,706
Percentage	61.42%	29.36%	5.56%
Swing	▲5.17%	▼11.72%	New

Republican
40–50%
50–60%
60–70%
70–80%
80–90%
Democratic
40–50%
50–60%
60–70%

The 2012 United States House of Representatives elections in Arkansas occurred on Tuesday, November 6, 2012, to elect the four U.S. representatives from the state, one from each of the state's four congressional districts. The elections coincided with the elections of other federal and state offices, including a quadrennial presidential election.

As the result of redistricting following the 2010 United States census, the boundaries of the state's congressional districts were redrawn by the then Democratic legislature. Democratic Governor Mike Beebe, who signed the new map into law in April 2011, described it as the "status quo" and not partisan. In the new map, five counties are split between districts, the first time in Arkansas history that counties have not been kept intact in congressional districts.

== Overview ==
=== Statewide ===
The table below shows the total number and percentage of votes, as well as the number of seats gained and lost by each political party in the election for the United States House of Representatives in Arkansas.

United States House of Representatives elections in Arkansas, 2012
Party	Votes	Percentage	Seats	+/–
Republican	637,591	61.4%	4	+1
Democratic	304,770	29.4%	0	-1
Green	57,706	5.6%	0	-
Libertarian	37,987	3.7%	0	-
Totals	1,038,054	100%	4	—

Popular vote
Republican	61.42%
Democratic	29.36%
Green	5.56%
Libertarian	3.66%

House seats
Republican	100.0%
Democratic	0%
Green	0%
Libertarian	0%

=== By district ===
Results of the 2012 United States House of Representatives elections in Arkansas by district:

District	Republican		Democratic		Green		Libertarian		Total		Result
District	Votes	%	Votes	%	Votes	%	Votes	%	Votes	%	Result
District 1	138,800	56.23%	96,601	39.13%	6,427	2.60%	5,015	2.03%	246,843	100.0%	Republican Hold
District 2	158,175	55.19%	113,156	39.48%	8,566	2.99%	6,701	2.34%	286,598	100.0%	Republican Hold
District 3	186,467	75.90%	0	0.00%	39,318	16.01%	19,875	8.09%	245,660	100.0%	Republican Hold
District 4	154,149	59.53%	95,013	36.69%	4,807	1.86%	4,984	1.93%	258,953	100.0%	Republican Gain
Total	637,591	61.42%	304,770	29.36%	57,706	5.56%	37,987	3.66%	1,038,054	100.0%	

== District 1 ==
2012 Arkansas's 1st congressional district election
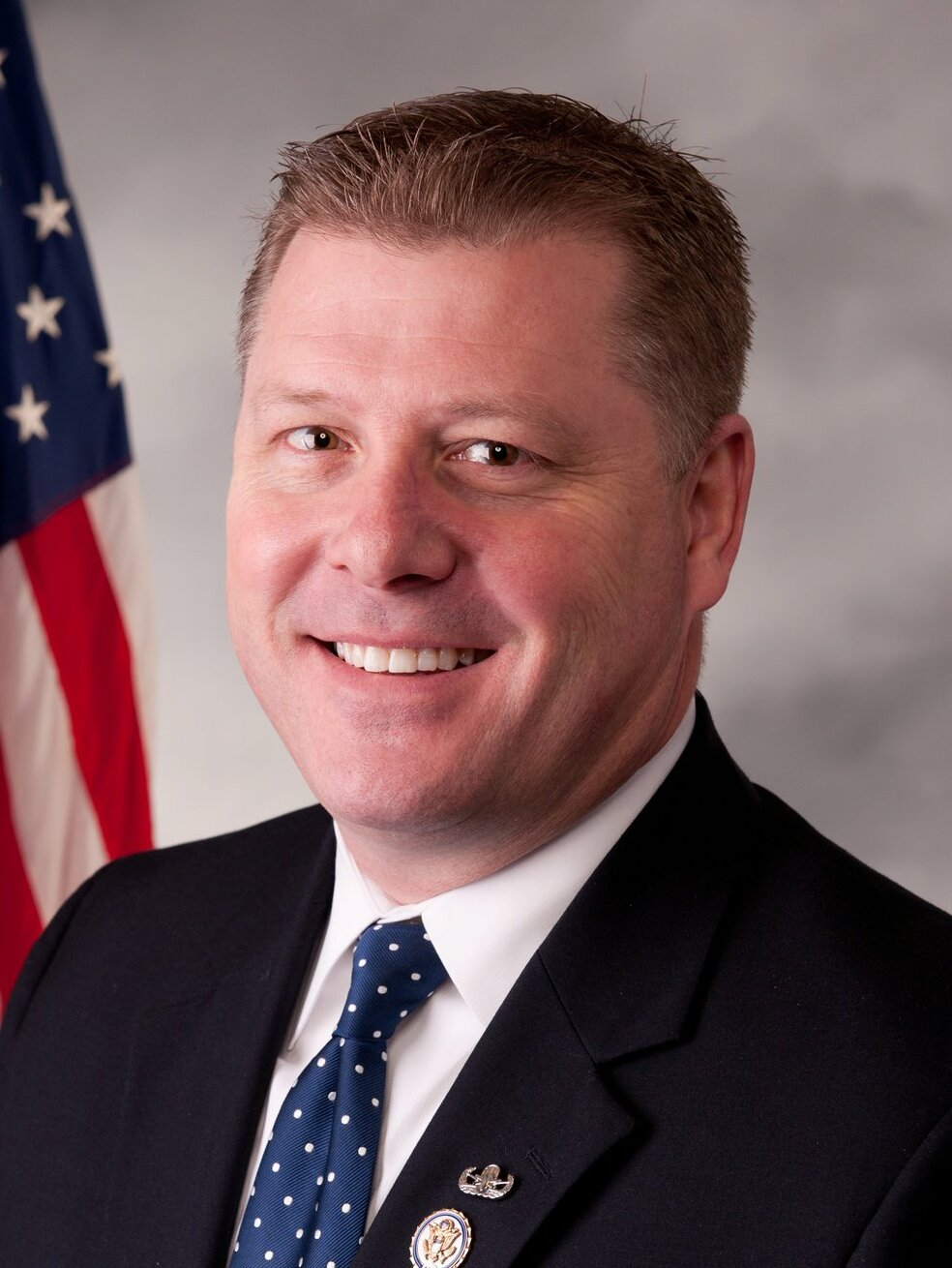

Nominee	Rick Crawford	Scott Ellington
Party	Republican	Democratic
Popular vote	138,800	96,601
Percentage	56.2%	39.1%
- County results Crawford: 40–50% 50–60% 60–70% 70–80% Ellington: 40–50% 50–60% 60–70%
U.S. Representative before election
Rick Crawford
Republican
Elected U.S. Representative
Rick Crawford
Republican

The 1st district had lost population, and so was drawn in the new map to incorporate counties in southeastern Arkansas which were previously a part of the 4th district. Republican incumbent Rick Crawford was first elected in 2010.

=== Republican primary ===
==== Candidates ====
===== Nominee =====
- Rick Crawford, incumbent U.S. Representative

=== Democratic primary ===
==== Candidates ====
===== Nominee =====
- Scott Ellington, prosecuting attorney

===== Eliminated in primary =====
- Clark Hall, state representative
- Gary Latanich, professor of economics at Arkansas State University

==== Declined ====
- Paul Bookout, president pro tempore of the Arkansas Senate;
- L. J. Bryant, business owner and nominee for Land Commissioner in 2010
- Chad Causey, former chief of staff to U.S. Representative Marion Berry and nominee for this seat in 2010
- David Cook, former state representative and candidate for this seat in 2010
- Keith Ingram, state representative
- Robert S. Moore Jr., Speaker of the state house of representatives;
- Steve Rockwell, businessman (who had considered running in 2010)
- Robert F. Thompson, state senator

==== Endorsements ====
Clark Hall

Organizations

- Blue Dog Coalition

==== Polling ====
Poll source	Date(s) administered	Sample size	Margin of error	Scott Ellington	Clark Hall	Gary Latanich	Undecided
Talk Business/Hendrix College	April 24–25, 2012	497	± 4.4%	15%	10%	4%	71%

==== Primary results ====
Democratic primary results
Party	Candidate	Votes	%
Democratic	Scott Ellington	27,936	49.5
Democratic	Clark M. Hall	21,861	38.8
Democratic	Gary Latanich	6,605	11.7
Total votes		56,402	100.0

=== Green primary ===
==== Candidates ====
===== Nominee =====
- Jacob Holloway, graduate student at Arkansas State University.

=== Libertarian primary ===
==== Candidates ====
===== Nominee =====
- Jessica Paxton, wife of Libertarian Party of Arkansas chairman Rodger Paxton

=== General election ===
==== Endorsements ====
Rick Crawford (R)

Organizations

- National Republican Congressional Committee "Patriot" Program
- NRA Political Victory Fund
- National Right to Life Committee
- United States Chamber of Commerce
Scott Ellington (D)

Labor unions

- AFL-CIO
- National Association of Letter Carriers
- National Education Association
- United Steelworkers

Organizations

- Democratic Congressional Campaign Committee "Emerging Races" Program

==== Polling ====
Poll source	Date(s) administered	Sample size	Margin of error	Rick Crawford (R)	Scott Ellington (D)	Undecided
Anzalone Liszt Research Ellington (D)	July 16–18, 2012	401	±4.9%	47%	45%	8%

==== Predictions ====
Source	Ranking	As of
The Cook Political Report	Safe R	November 5, 2012
Rothenberg	Safe R	November 2, 2012
Roll Call	Safe R	November 4, 2012
Sabato's Crystal Ball	Safe R	November 5, 2012
NY Times	Safe R	November 4, 2012
RCP	Safe R	November 4, 2012
The Hill	Likely R	November 4, 2012

==== Results ====
2012 Arkansas's 1st congressional district election
Party	Candidate	Votes	%
Republican	Rick Crawford (incumbent)	138,800	56.2
Democratic	Scott Ellington	96,601	39.1
Libertarian	Jessica Paxton	6,427	2.6
Green	Jacob Holloway	5,015	2.0
Total votes		246,843	100.0
Republican hold			

==== By county ====
County	Rick Crawford Republican		Scott Ellington Democratic		Various candidates Other parties		Margin		Total
County	#	%	#	%	#	%	#	%	Total
Arkansas	3,517	55.64%	2,510	39.71%	294	4.65%	1,007	15.93%	6,321
Baxter	13,033	68.85%	5,011	26.47%	885	4.68%	8,022	42.38%	18,929
Chicot	1,459	33.91%	2,757	64.07%	87	2.02%	-1,298	-30.17%	4,303
Clay	2,929	58.71%	1,884	37.76%	176	3.53%	1,045	20.95%	4,989
Cleburne	7,965	70.18%	2,821	24.85%	564	4.97%	5,144	45.32%	11,350
Craighead	17,834	56.62%	12,400	39.37%	1,265	4.02%	5,434	17.25%	31,499
Crittenden	6,535	41.15%	8,538	53.77%	807	5.08%	-2,003	-12.61%	15,880
Cross	3,749	58.08%	2,402	37.21%	304	4.71%	1,347	20.87%	6,455
Desha	1,432	34.08%	2,625	62.47%	145	3.45%	-1,193	-28.39%	4,202
Fulton	2,541	57.49%	1,689	38.21%	190	4.30%	852	19.28%	4,420
Greene	7,813	58.53%	4,843	36.28%	693	5.19%	2,970	22.25%	13,349
Independence	8,079	66.60%	3,572	29.45%	479	3.95%	4,507	37.16%	12,130
Izard	3,199	61.53%	1,727	33.22%	273	5.25%	1,472	28.31%	5,199
Jackson	2,670	51.16%	2,312	44.30%	237	4.54%	358	6.86%	5,219
Jefferson (part)	130	26.69%	327	67.15%	30	6.16%	-197	-40.45%	487
Lawrence	3,061	55.54%	2,199	39.90%	251	4.55%	862	15.64%	5,511
Lee	1,124	34.02%	2,055	62.20%	125	3.78%	-931	-28.18%	3,304
Lincoln	1,802	49.21%	1,672	45.66%	188	5.13%	130	3.55%	3,662
Lonoke	16,428	69.73%	6,017	25.54%	1,115	4.73%	10,411	44.19%	23,560
Mississippi	5,902	46.73%	6,049	47.89%	679	5.38%	-147	-1.16%	12,630
Monroe	1,365	44.40%	1,574	51.20%	135	4.39%	-209	-6.80%	3,074
Phillips	2,367	31.56%	4,642	61.90%	490	6.53%	-2,275	-30.34%	7,499
Poinsett	4,179	55.73%	3,056	40.76%	263	3.51%	1,123	14.98%	7,498
Prairie	1,904	62.06%	1,042	33.96%	122	3.98%	862	28.10%	3,068
Randolph	3,323	56.87%	2,227	38.11%	293	5.01%	1,096	18.76%	5,843
Searcy (part)	2,360	70.43%	724	21.61%	267	7.97%	1,636	48.82%	3,351
Sharp	4,451	61.96%	2,378	33.10%	355	4.94%	2,073	28.86%	7,184
St. Francis	3,092	38.38%	4,647	57.68%	317	3.93%	-1,555	-19.30%	8,056
Stone	3,410	65.09%	1,550	29.59%	279	5.33%	1,860	35.50%	5,239
Woodruff	1,147	43.58%	1,351	51.33%	134	5.09%	-204	-7.75%	2,632
Totals	138,800	56.23%	96,601	39.13%	11,442	4.64%	42,199	17.10%	246,843

== District 2 ==
2012 Arkansas's 2nd congressional district election
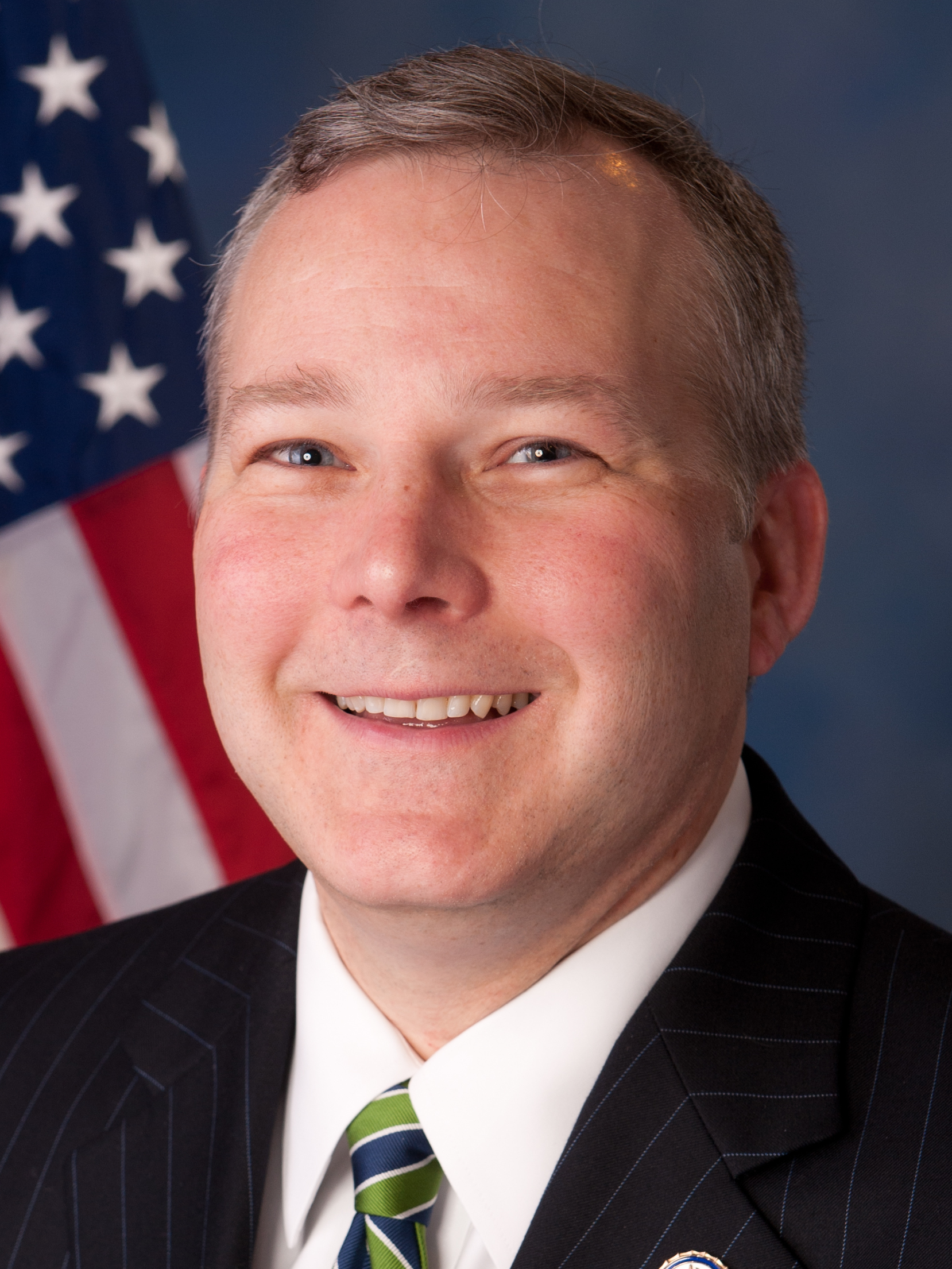

Nominee	Tim Griffin	Herb Rule
Party	Republican	Democratic
Popular vote	158,175	113,156
Percentage	55.2%	39.5%
- County results Griffin: 50–60% 60–70% 70–80% Rule: 50–60%
U.S. Representative before election
Tim Griffin
Republican
Elected U.S. Representative
Tim Griffin
Republican

Population growth in Arkansas's central counties meant that the 2nd district had to shrink in the new map. Under the new map, the 2nd district is likely to continue to favor Republicans.

Republican incumbent Timothy Griffin was first elected in 2010.

=== Republican primary ===
==== Candidates ====
===== Nominee =====
- Tim Griffin, incumbent U.S. Representative

=== Democratic primary ===
==== Candidates ====
===== Nominee =====
- Herb Rule, attorney and former state representative

==== Declined ====
- David Boling, former chief of staff to U.S. Representative Vic Snyder and candidate for this seat in 2010
- Bob Edwards, attorney (who had considered running in 2010)
- John Charles Edwards, state representative
- Drew Pritt, political consultant
- Bill Halter, former Lieutenant Governor of Arkansas and candidate for Senate in 2010
- Pat Hays, Mayor of North Little Rock;
- David Johnson, state senator
- Jay Martin, lawyer and former state representative
- Tracy Steele, state representative
- Robbie Wills, former speaker of the state House of Representatives and candidate for this seat in 2010

=== Libertarian primary ===
==== Candidates ====
===== Nominee =====
- Chris Hayes

=== General election ===
==== Endorsements ====
Tim Griffin (R)

Organizations

- Gun Owners of America
- NRA Political Victory Fund
- National Right to Life Committee
- United States Chamber of Commerce
Herb Rule (D)

Labor unions

- National Education Association
- United Steelworkers

==== Predictions ====
Source	Ranking	As of
The Cook Political Report	Safe R	November 5, 2012
Rothenberg	Safe R	November 2, 2012
Roll Call	Safe R	November 4, 2012
Sabato's Crystal Ball	Safe R	November 5, 2012
NY Times	Safe R	November 4, 2012
RCP	Safe R	November 4, 2012
The Hill	Safe R	November 4, 2012

==== Results ====
2012 Arkansas's 2nd congressional district election
Party	Candidate	Votes	%
Republican	Tim Griffin (incumbent)	158,175	55.2
Democratic	Herb Rule	113,156	39.5
Green	Barbara Ward	8,566	3.0
Libertarian	Chris Hayes	6,701	2.3
Total votes		286,598	100.0
Republican hold			

==== By county ====
County	Tim Griffin Republican		Herb Rule Democratic		Various candidates Other parties		Margin		Total
County	#	%	#	%	#	%	#	%	Total
Conway	4,445	58.80%	2,777	36.73%	338	4.47%	1,668	22.06%	7,560
Faulkner	26,243	64.61%	12,179	29.98%	2,196	5.41%	14,064	34.63%	40,618
Perry	2,489	64.52%	1,112	28.82%	257	6.66%	1,377	35.69%	3,858
Pulaski	68,535	44.02%	78,886	50.67%	8,254	5.30%	-10,351	-6.65%	155,675
Saline	32,680	70.23%	11,510	24.73%	2,346	5.04%	21,170	45.49%	46,536
Van Buren	4,307	67.88%	1,689	26.62%	349	5.50%	2,618	41.26%	6,345
White	19,476	74.89%	5,003	19.24%	1,527	5.87%	14,473	55.65%	26,006
Totals	158,175	55.19%	113,156	39.48%	15,267	5.33%	45,019	15.71%	286,598

== District 3 ==
2012 Arkansas's 3rd congressional district election
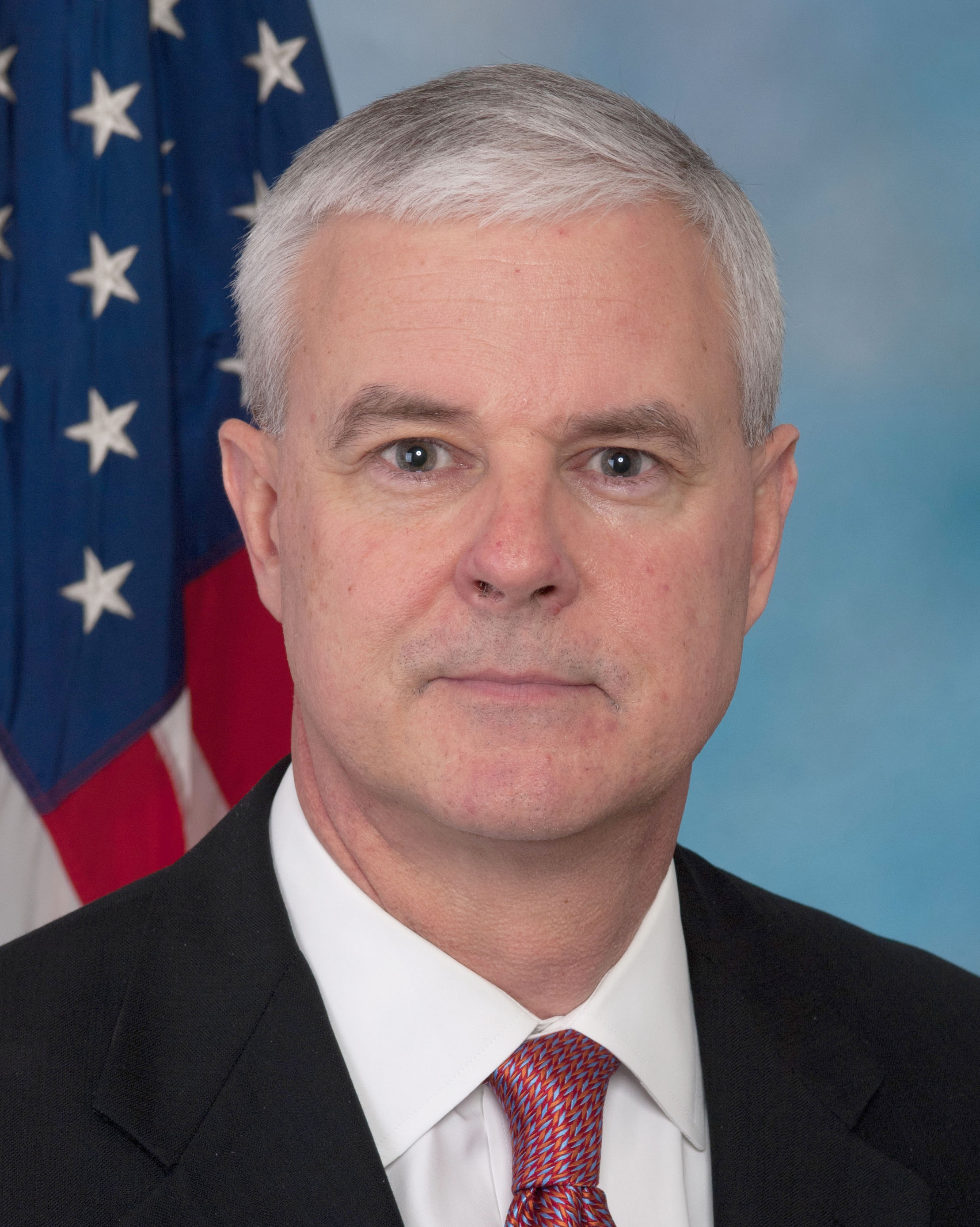

Nominee	Steve Womack	Rebekah Kennedy	David Pangrac
Party	Republican	Green	Libertarian
Popular vote	186,467	39,318	19,875
Percentage	75.9%	16.0%	8.1%
- County results Womack: 60–70% 70–80% 80–90%
U.S. Representative before election
Steve Womack
Republican
Elected U.S. Representative
Steve Womack
Republican

Population growth in Arkansas's northwestern counties meant that the 3rd district had to shrink in the new map. Under the new map, the 3rd district is likely to continue to favor Republicans.

Republican incumbent Steve Womack was first elected in 2010.

=== Republican primary ===
==== Candidates ====
===== Nominee =====
- Steve Womack, incumbent U.S. Representative

=== Democratic primary ===
==== Candidates ====
===== Nominee =====
- Ken Aden, former director for West Memphis-based nonprofit Residents 4 Arkansas

=== Green primary ===
==== Candidates ====
===== Nominee =====
- Rebekah Kennedy, nominee for Senate in 2008 and for state attorney general in 2010.

=== Libertarian primary ===
==== Candidates ====
===== Nominee =====
- David Pangrac, Libertarian Party of Arkansas Vice Chairman

=== General election ===
==== Campaign ====
Aden would withdraw from the race after admitting to exaggerating his military record. Under Arkansas law, the Democratic Party was unable to field a replacement candidate for Aden and no Democrat appeared on the general election ballot. On August 14, 2012, Kennedy received the endorsement of the Arkansas state AFL-CIO labor union.

==== Endorsements ====
Steve Womack (R)

Organizations

- NRA Political Victory Fund
- National Right to Life Committee
- United States Chamber of Commerce
Ken Aden (D)

Labor unions

- United Steelworkers
Rebekah Kennedy (G)

Labor unions

- AFL-CIO

==== Predictions ====
Source	Ranking	As of
The Cook Political Report	Safe R	November 5, 2012
Rothenberg	Safe R	November 2, 2012
Roll Call	Safe R	November 4, 2012
Sabato's Crystal Ball	Safe R	November 5, 2012
NY Times	Safe R	November 4, 2012
RCP	Safe R	November 4, 2012
The Hill	Safe R	November 4, 2012

==== Results ====
2012 Arkansas's 3rd congressional district election
Party	Candidate	Votes	%
Republican	Steve Womack (incumbent)	186,467	75.9
Green	Rebekah Kennedy	39,318	16.0
Libertarian	David Pangrac	19,875	8.1
Total votes		245,660	100.0
Republican hold			

==== By county ====
County	Steve Womack Republican		Rebekah Kennedy Green		David Pangrac Libertarian		Margin		Total
County	#	%	#	%	#	%	#	%	Total
Benton	59,924	79.22%	9,533	12.60%	6,182	8.17%	50,391	66.62%	75,639
Boone	11,983	82.20%	1,801	12.36%	793	5.44%	10,182	69.85%	14,577
Carroll	6,711	69.31%	2,177	22.48%	795	8.21%	4,534	46.82%	9,683
Crawford (part)	11,393	80.60%	1,755	12.42%	988	6.99%	9,638	68.18%	14,136
Marion	5,232	78.36%	912	13.66%	533	7.98%	4,320	64.70%	6,677
Newton (part)	1,261	81.72%	188	12.18%	94	6.09%	1,073	69.54%	1,543
Pope	15,441	78.35%	2,953	14.98%	1,314	6.67%	12,488	63.37%	19,708
Searcy (part)	172	84.31%	24	11.76%	8	3.92%	148	72.55%	204
Sebastian (part)	28,415	77.65%	4,868	13.30%	3,312	9.05%	23,547	64.34%	36,595
Washington	45,935	68.66%	15,107	22.58%	5,856	8.75%	30,828	46.08%	66,898
Totals	186,467	75.90%	39,318	16.01%	19,875	8.09%	147,149	59.90%	245,660

== District 4 ==
2012 Arkansas's 4th congressional district election
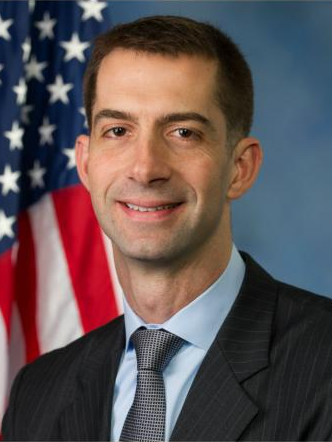

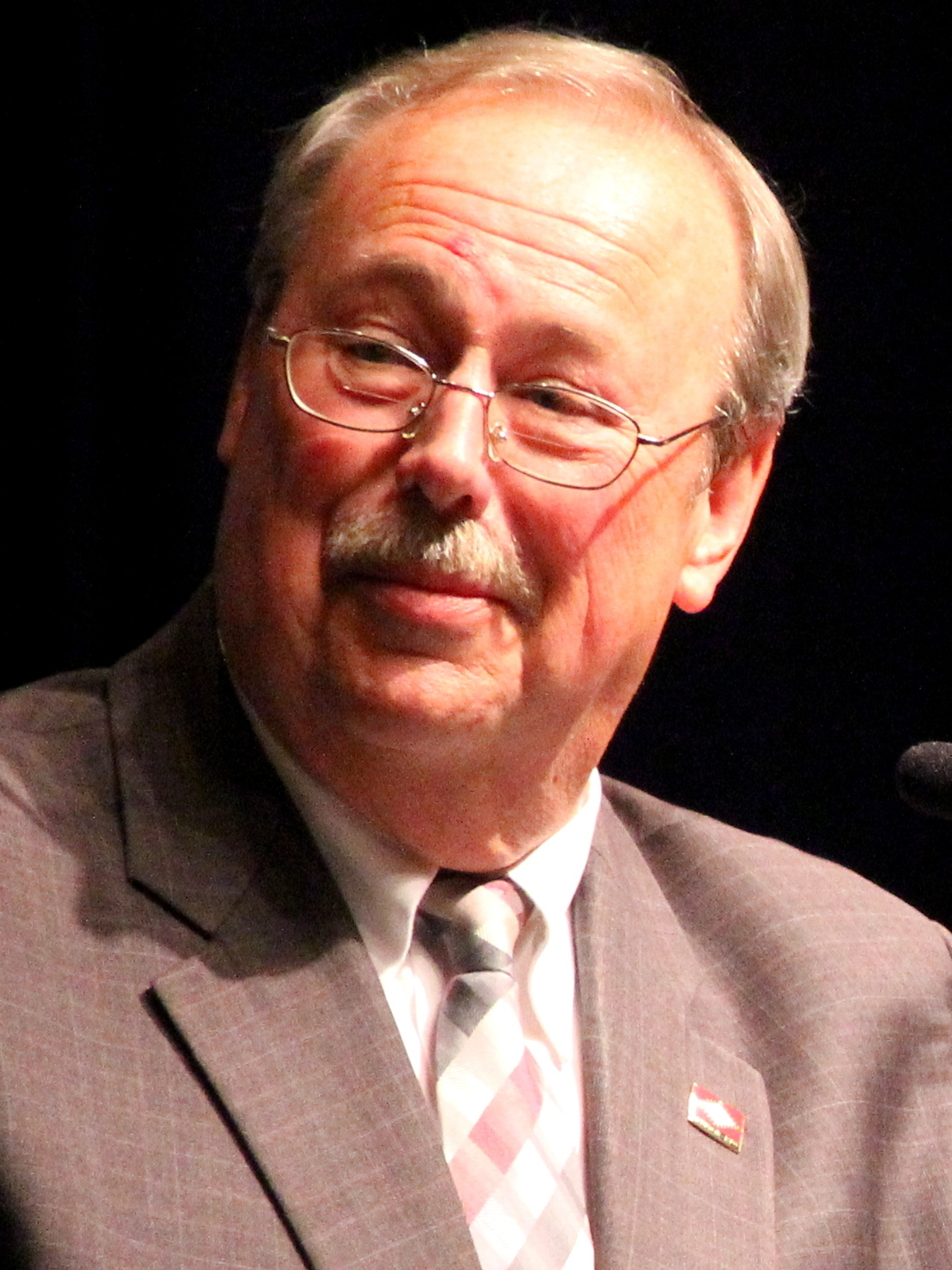
Nominee	Tom Cotton	Gene Jeffress
Party	Republican	Democratic
Popular vote	154,149	95,013
Percentage	59.5%	36.7%
- County results Cotton: 50–60% 60–70% 70–80% Jeffress: 50–60% 60–70%
U.S. Representative before election
Mike Ross
Democratic
Elected U.S. Representative
Tom Cotton
Republican

Under the new map, the 4th district loses some territory in the east of the state to the 1st district and gains some Republican-leaning northwestern Arkansas counties from the 3rd district. The district also gains Yell County from the 2nd district, which is expected to make the 4th district more favorable to Democrats.

Democratic incumbent Mike Ross, who was first elected in 2000, chose not to seek re-election.

=== Democratic primary ===
==== Candidates ====
===== Nominee =====
- Gene Jeffress, state senator

===== Eliminated in primary =====
- D.C. Morrison, businessman and candidate for Senate in 2010
- Q. Byrum Hurst Jr., attorney and small business owner

===== Declined =====
- Robin Carroll, prosecutor and former legal counsel to the Democratic Party;
- Conner Eldridge, U.S. Attorney for the Western District of Arkansas
- Steve Faris, former state senator
- Greg Hale, consultant for The Markham Group;
- Steve Harrelson, state senator
- Mike Hathorn, former state representative and candidate for lieutenant governor in 2010
- Carlton Jones, prosecutor from Texarkana
- Chris Masingill, head of the Delta Regional Authority and a former staff member for Ross and Governor Mike Beebe
- Bruce Maloch, state representative
- Gregg Reep, state representative
- Mike Ross, incumbent U.S. Representative
- Larry Teague, state senator
- Chris Thomason, former state representative and chancellor of the University of Arkansas Community College at Hope
- Jeff Weaver, district director for Mike Ross
- Hank Wilkins, state representative

==== Polling ====
Poll source	Date(s) administered	Sample size	Margin of error	Q. Byrum Hurst	Gene Jeffress	D.C. Morrison	Undecided
Talk Business/Hendrix College	May 10, 2012	418	± 4.8%	23%	22%	11%	44%

==== Primary results ====
Democratic primary results
Party	Candidate	Votes	%
Democratic	Gene Jeffress	23,848	43.0
Democratic	Q. Byrum Hurst	19,812	35.7
Democratic	DC Morrison	11,771	21.2
Total votes		55,431	100.0

==== Primary runoff results ====
Democratic primary runoff results
Party	Candidate	Votes	%
Democratic	Gene Jeffress	15,266	60.7
Democratic	Q. Byrum Hurst	9,895	39.3
Total votes		25,161	100.0

=== Republican primary ===
==== Candidates ====
===== Nominee =====
- Tom Cotton, consultant and Army reservist

===== Eliminated in primary =====
- John Cowart, police officer and currently serving U.S. Marine Corps Reserve lieutenant colonel in Afghanistan
- Beth Anne Rankin, teacher, former Miss Arkansas & nominee for this seat in 2010

==== Withdrew ====
- Marcus Richmond, business owner and retired Marine Corps lieutenant colonel

==== Polling ====
Poll source	Date(s) administered	Sample size	Margin of error	Tom Cotton	John Cowart	Beth Anne Rankin	Undecided
Talk Business/Hendrix College	May 10, 2012	437	± 4.7%	51%	6%	33%	10%
Talk Business/Hendrix College	April 17, 2012	542	± 4.2%	38.5%	4%	38.5%	19%

==== Primary results ====
Republican primary results
Party	Candidate	Votes	%
Republican	Tom Cotton	20,899	57.6
Republican	Beth Anne Rankin	13,460	37.1
Republican	John Cowart	1,953	5.4
Total votes		36,312	100.0

=== Green primary ===
==== Candidates ====
===== Nominee =====
- J. Joshua Drake

=== Libertarian primary ===
Bobby Tullis had considered seeking Libertarian nomination for the seat; however in December 2011 Tullis gave his support to Republican candidate Beth Anne Rankin; nevertheless, he was subsequently nominated as the Libertarian candidate.

==== Candidates ====
===== Nominee =====
- Bobby Tullis, former Democratic state representative and unsuccessful Green Party nominee for state treasurer in 2010

=== General election ===
==== Endorsements ====
Gene Jeffress (D)

Labor unions

- AFL-CIO
- National Association of Letter Carriers
- National Education Association
- United Steelworkers
Tom Cotton (R)

Organizations

- Club for Growth
- Eagle Forum
- Gun Owners of America
- National Right to Life Committee
- Tea Party Express
- United States Chamber of Commerce

==== Predictions ====
Source	Ranking	As of
The Cook Political Report	Likely R (flip)	November 5, 2012
Rothenberg	Safe R (flip)	November 2, 2012
Roll Call	Safe R (flip)	November 4, 2012
Sabato's Crystal Ball	Safe R (flip)	November 5, 2012
NY Times	Safe R (flip)	November 4, 2012
RCP	Safe R (flip)	November 4, 2012
The Hill	Likely R (flip)	November 4, 2012

==== Results ====
2012 Arkansas's 4th congressional district election
Party	Candidate	Votes	%
Republican	Tom Cotton	154,149	59.5
Democratic	Gene Jeffress	95,013	36.7
Libertarian	Bobby Tullis	4,984	1.9
Green	J. Joshua Drake	4,807	1.9
Total votes		258,953	100.0
Republican gain from Democratic			

==== By county ====
County	Gene Jeffress Democratic		Tom Cotton Republican		Various candidates Other parties		Margin		Total
County	#	%	#	%	#	%	#	%	Total
Ashley	4,089	52.58%	3,537	45.48%	151	1.94%	-552	-7.10%	7,777
Bradley	1,649	46.19%	1,840	51.54%	81	2.27%	191	5.35%	3,570
Calhoun	984	45.94%	1,115	52.05%	43	2.01%	131	6.12%	2,142
Clark	3,727	45.15%	4,285	51.91%	243	2.94%	558	6.76%	8,255
Cleveland	965	30.15%	2,154	67.29%	82	2.56%	1,189	37.14%	3,201
Columbia	3,399	38.29%	5,116	57.63%	362	4.08%	1,717	19.34%	8,877
Crawford (part)	1,206	21.33%	4,265	75.42%	184	3.25%	3,059	54.09%	5,655
Dallas	1,408	46.87%	1,514	50.40%	82	2.73%	106	3.53%	3,004
Drew	2,863	43.83%	3,489	53.41%	180	2.76%	626	9.58%	6,532
Franklin	1,559	24.11%	4,748	73.44%	158	2.44%	3,189	49.33%	6,465
Garland	11,767	29.39%	26,379	65.89%	1,890	4.72%	14,612	36.50%	40,036
Grant	1,752	27.26%	4,476	69.63%	200	3.11%	2,724	42.38%	6,428
Hempstead	2,608	39.24%	3,673	55.26%	366	5.51%	1,065	16.02%	6,647
Hot Spring	3,727	33.61%	6,883	62.07%	479	4.32%	3,156	28.46%	11,089
Howard	1,433	33.26%	2,359	54.75%	517	12.00%	926	21.49%	4,309
Jefferson (part)	15,768	60.76%	9,454	36.43%	731	2.82%	-6,314	-24.33%	25,953
Johnson	2,461	30.74%	5,251	65.59%	294	3.67%	2,790	34.85%	8,006
Lafayette	1,165	42.16%	1,501	54.33%	97	3.51%	336	12.16%	2,763
Little River	2,088	43.43%	2,443	50.81%	277	5.76%	355	7.38%	4,808
Logan	1,800	24.68%	5,324	72.99%	170	2.33%	3,524	48.31%	7,294
Madison	1,906	29.25%	4,398	67.49%	213	3.27%	2,492	38.24%	6,517
Miller	5,037	34.10%	9,149	61.94%	584	3.95%	4,112	27.84%	14,770
Montgomery	865	25.68%	2,368	70.31%	135	4.01%	1,503	44.63%	3,368
Nevada	1,363	41.22%	1,810	54.73%	134	4.05%	447	13.52%	3,307
Newton (part)	743	37.58%	1,108	56.04%	126	6.37%	365	18.46%	1,977
Ouachita	5,306	53.36%	4,425	44.50%	213	2.14%	-881	-8.86%	9,944
Pike	978	26.18%	2,652	70.99%	106	2.84%	1,674	44.81%	3,736
Polk	1,510	19.81%	5,832	76.53%	279	3.66%	4,322	56.71%	7,621
Scott	698	19.31%	2,758	76.31%	158	4.37%	2,060	57.00%	3,614
Sebastian (part)	926	18.03%	4,079	79.40%	132	2.57%	3,153	61.38%	5,137
Sevier	1,404	33.33%	2,318	55.02%	491	11.65%	914	21.69%	4,213
Union	6,601	41.22%	8,935	55.79%	480	3.00%	2,334	14.57%	16,016
Yell	1,258	21.24%	4,511	76.17%	153	2.58%	3,253	54.93%	5,922
Totals	95,013	36.69%	154,149	59.53%	9,791	3.78%	59,136	22.84%	258,953
