= Bobby Tullis =

American politician

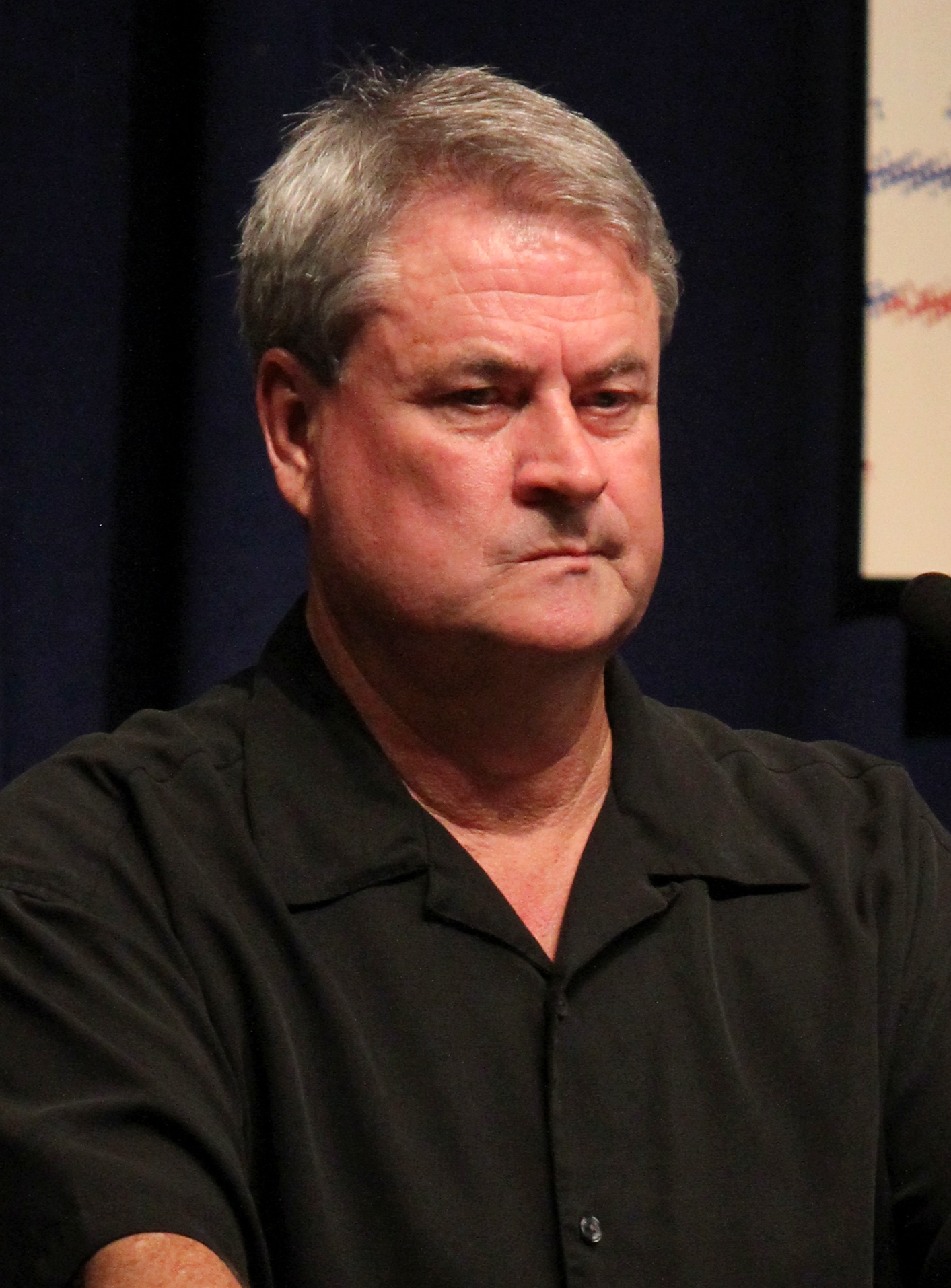

Mayor of Mineral Springs
- In office January 2015 – May 15, 2019
- Preceded by: W. S. Heatherly

Member of the Arkansas House of Representatives from the 86th district
- In office 1983–1993
- Succeeded by: Bobby Wood

Member of the Arkansas House of Representatives from the 18th district
- In office 1979–1983
- Preceded by: Corky Carlton
- Succeeded by: Pat Ellis

Personal details
- Born: 1950 or 1951 (age 75–76)
- Party: Libertarian (2011–present)
- Other political affiliations: Democratic (before 2010); Green (2010–2011)

Robert Wayne Tullis (born 1950/51) is an American politician of the Libertarian Party. He is a former mayor of Mineral Springs, Arkansas, serving from 2015 to 2019, and a former member of the Arkansas House of Representatives, serving from 1979 until 1993.

== Biography ==
Tullis was born to Denzil Tullis and Nina Whitmore Tullis. He served in the House from 1979 until 1993 as a Democrat, representing the 86th district, which comprised parts of Howard and Sevier counties. In 1994, Tullis mounted a campaign for Arkansas State Auditor, losing narrowly in the Democratic primary to Gus Wingfield. In 2010, he was the Green Party nominee for Arkansas State Treasurer, losing to Democratic incumbent Martha Shoffner. The same year, Tullis ran for mayor of Mineral Springs. While he finished in first place with 46% of the vote, since he did not attain a majority a runoff election was necessary, which he lost.

In 2012, Tullis ran for Arkansas's 4th congressional district. After initially exploring a run as a Republican and Libertarian, he later endorsed Republican candidate Beth Anne Rankin. Tullis later decided to run as a Libertarian as Rankin failed to win the Republican nomination. He lost to Republican Tom Cotton.

In 2014, Tullis unsuccessfully sought the Libertarian nomination for Treasurer. That same year, he was elected mayor of Mineral Springs. He chose not to seek re-election in 2018.

Tullis was the only Libertarian holding elected office in Arkansas during his time as mayor of Mineral Springs.

On May 15, 2019, Tullis resigned as mayor, citing health issues.

== Electoral history ==
Arkansas State Auditor Democratic primary, 1994
| Party | Candidate | Votes | % |
|---|---|---|---|
| Democratic | Gus Wingfield | 166,856 | 51.8% |
| Democratic | Bobby Tullis | 155,018 | 48.2% |
| Total votes | | 321,874 | 100% |

Arkansas State Treasurer election, 2010
| Party | Candidate | Votes | % |
|---|---|---|---|
| Democratic | Martha Shoffner | 479,701 | 67.5% |
| Green | Bobby Tullis | 230,594 | 32.5% |
| Total votes | | 710,495 | 100% |

Arkansas's 4th congressional district election, 2012
| Party | Candidate | Votes | % |
|---|---|---|---|
| Republican | Tom Cotton | 154,149 | 59.5% |
| Democratic | Gene Jeffress | 95,013 | 36.7% |
| Libertarian | Bobby Tullis | 4,984 | 1.9% |
| Green | J. Joshua Drake | 4,807 | 1.9% |
| Total votes | | 258,953 | 100% |
