= 2016 United States House of Representatives elections in Arkansas =

- November 8, 2016

All 4 Arkansas seats to the United States House of Representatives
| | Majority party | Minority party | Third party |
|---|---|---|---|
| Party | Republican | Libertarian | Democratic |
| Last election | 4 | 0 | 0 |
| Seats won | 4 | 0 | 0 |
| Seat change | Steady | Steady | Steady |
| Popular vote | 760,415 | 196,512 | 111,347 |
| Percentage | 71.16% | 18.39% | 10.42% |
| Swing | ▲9.83% | ▲10.42% | ▼20.22% |

Republican
50–60%
60–70%
70–80%
80–90%
Democratic
40–50%

The 2016 United States House of Representatives elections in Arkansas were held on Tuesday, November 8, 2016, to elect the four U.S. representatives from the state of Arkansas, one from each of the state's four congressional districts. The elections coincided with the elections of other federal and state offices, including President of the United States. The primaries were held on March 1.

== Overview ==
Although Libertarian Party presidential candidate Gary Johnson only obtained 2.6% of the vote in Arkansas during the coinciding presidential election, Libertarian candidates for the U.S. House amounted to a total of 18.4% of the popular vote, a 10.4% swing from 2014 when the total was 8%. This huge swing was attributed to several factors:

1. the Libertarian Party was the only third party to file for ballot status in the House elections;
2. the Democratic Party did not field any candidates for races in the 1st, 3rd, and 4th congressional districts;
3. this in turn allowing the Libertarian candidates to obtain over 20% of the vote in these races.

The Democratic Party as a result finished 3rd in the popular vote in Arkansas, with its vote total amounting to 10.4%.

=== Statewide ===
Popular vote
| Republican | 71.16% |
| Libertarian | 18.39% |
| Democratic | 10.42% |
| Other | 0.03% |

House seats
| Republican | 100.0% |
| Democratic | 0% |

=== District ===
Results of the 2016 United States House of Representatives elections in Arkansas by district:

| District | Republican | | Democratic | | Libertarian | | Others | | Total | | Result |
| District | Votes | % | Votes | % | Votes | % | Votes | % | Votes | % | Result |
|---|---|---|---|---|---|---|---|---|---|---|---|
| District 1 | 183,866 | 76.28% | 0 | 0.00% | 57,181 | 23.72% | 0 | 0.00% | 241,047 | 100.0% | Republican Hold |
| District 2 | 176,472 | 58.34% | 111,347 | 36.81% | 14,342 | 4.74% | 303 | 0.10% | 302,464 | 100.0% | Republican Hold |
| District 3 | 217,192 | 77.32% | 0 | 0.00% | 63,715 | 22.68% | 0 | 0.00% | 280,907 | 100.0% | Republican Hold |
| District 4 | 182,885 | 74.90% | 0 | 0.00% | 61,274 | 25.10% | 0 | 0.00% | 244,159 | 100.0% | Republican Hold |
| Total | 760,415 | 71.16% | 111,347 | 10.42% | 196,512 | 18.39% | 303 | 0.03% | 1,068,577 | 100.0% | |

== District 1 ==
2016 Arkansas's 1st congressional district election
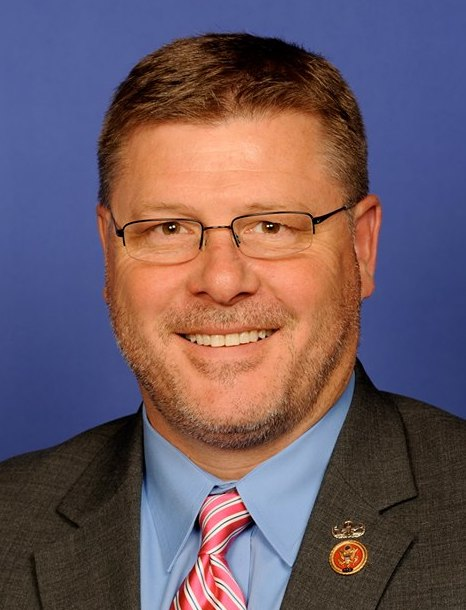

| Nominee | Rick Crawford | Mark West |
| Party | Republican | Libertarian |
| Popular vote | 183,866 | 57,181 |
| Percentage | 76.3% | 23.7% |
- County results Crawford: 50–60% 60–70% 70–80% 80–90%
U.S. Representative before election
Rick Crawford
Republican
Elected U.S. Representative
Rick Crawford
Republican

Incumbent Republican Rick Crawford, who had represented the district since 2011, ran for re-election. He was re-elected with 63% of the vote in 2014. The district had a PVI of R+14.

=== Republican primary ===
==== Candidates ====
===== Nominee =====
- Rick Crawford, incumbent U.S. Representative

=== Democratic primary ===
There was no Democratic nominee for this election.

=== Libertarian primary ===
==== Candidates ====
===== Nominee =====
- Mark West

=== General election ===
==== Debate ====
2016 Arkansas's 1st congressional district debate
| No. | Date | Host | Moderator | Link | Republican | Libertarian |
| Key: P Participant A Absent N Not invited I Invited W Withdrawn | | | | | | |
| Key: P Participant A Absent N Not invited I Invited W Withdrawn | | | | | Rick Crawford | Mark West |
|---|---|---|---|---|---|---|
| 1 | Oct. 12, 2016 | Arkansas PBS | Steve Barnes | | P | P |

==== Predictions ====
| Source | Ranking | As of |
|---|---|---|
| The Cook Political Report | Safe R | November 7, 2016 |
| Daily Kos Elections | Safe R | November 7, 2016 |
| Rothenberg | Safe R | November 3, 2016 |
| Sabato's Crystal Ball | Safe R | November 7, 2016 |
| RCP | Safe R | October 31, 2016 |

==== Results ====
2016 Arkansas's 1st congressional district election
| Party | Candidate | Votes | % |
|---|---|---|---|
| Republican | Rick Crawford (incumbent) | 183,866 | 76.3 |
| Libertarian | Mark West | 57,181 | 23.7 |
| Total votes | | 241,047 | 100.0 |
| Republican hold | | | |

==== By county ====
| County | Rick Crawford Republican | | Mark West Libertarian | | Margin | | Total |
| County | # | % | # | % | # | % | Total |
|---|---|---|---|---|---|---|---|
| Arkansas | 4,320 | 74.84% | 1,452 | 25.16% | 2,868 | 49.69% | 5,772 |
| Baxter | 14,947 | 79.93% | 3,754 | 20.07% | 11,193 | 59.85% | 18,701 |
| Chicot | 2,119 | 55.54% | 1,696 | 44.46% | 423 | 11.09% | 3,815 |
| Clay | 3,769 | 84.77% | 677 | 15.23% | 3,092 | 69.55% | 4,446 |
| Cleburne | 9,590 | 83.45% | 1,902 | 16.55% | 7,688 | 66.90% | 11,492 |
| Craighead | 26,499 | 77.69% | 7,608 | 22.31% | 18,891 | 55.39% | 34,107 |
| Crittenden | 7,754 | 55.68% | 6,171 | 44.32% | 1,583 | 11.37% | 13,925 |
| Cross | 5,005 | 79.31% | 1,306 | 20.69% | 3,699 | 58.61% | 6,311 |
| Desha | 2,197 | 62.20% | 1,335 | 37.80% | 862 | 24.41% | 3,532 |
| Fulton | 3,496 | 80.81% | 830 | 19.19% | 2,666 | 61.63% | 4,326 |
| Greene | 11,601 | 84.06% | 2,200 | 15.94% | 9,401 | 68.12% | 13,801 |
| Independence | 10,135 | 78.35% | 2,800 | 21.65% | 7,335 | 56.71% | 12,935 |
| Izard | 4,234 | 82.81% | 879 | 17.19% | 3,355 | 65.62% | 5,113 |
| Jackson | 3,867 | 79.55% | 994 | 20.45% | 2,873 | 59.10% | 4,861 |
| Jefferson (part) | 186 | 52.25% | 170 | 47.75% | 16 | 4.49% | 356 |
| Lawrence | 4,488 | 83.33% | 898 | 16.67% | 3,590 | 66.65% | 5,386 |
| Lee | 1,480 | 55.70% | 1,177 | 44.30% | 303 | 11.40% | 2,657 |
| Lincoln | 2,573 | 72.81% | 961 | 27.19% | 1,612 | 45.61% | 3,534 |
| Lonoke | 21,096 | 81.44% | 4,808 | 18.56% | 16,288 | 62.88% | 25,904 |
| Mississippi | 8,258 | 73.00% | 3,054 | 27.00% | 5,204 | 46.00% | 11,312 |
| Monroe | 1,695 | 69.64% | 739 | 30.36% | 956 | 39.28% | 2,434 |
| Phillips | 3,030 | 51.68% | 2,833 | 48.32% | 197 | 3.36% | 5,863 |
| Poinsett | 6,130 | 81.80% | 1,364 | 18.20% | 4,766 | 63.60% | 7,494 |
| Prairie | 2,665 | 84.34% | 495 | 15.66% | 2,170 | 68.67% | 3,160 |
| Randolph | 4,985 | 81.94% | 1,099 | 18.06% | 3,886 | 63.87% | 6,084 |
| Searcy (part) | 2,648 | 82.65% | 556 | 17.35% | 2,092 | 65.29% | 3,204 |
| Sharp | 5,716 | 82.98% | 1,172 | 17.02% | 4,544 | 65.97% | 6,888 |
| St. Francis | 3,530 | 58.22% | 2,533 | 41.78% | 997 | 16.44% | 6,063 |
| Stone | 4,216 | 79.94% | 1,058 | 20.06% | 3,158 | 59.88% | 5,274 |
| Woodruff | 1,637 | 71.27% | 660 | 28.73% | 977 | 42.53% | 2,297 |
| Totals | 183,866 | 76.28% | 57,181 | 23.72% | 126,685 | 52.56% | 241,047 |

== District 2 ==
2016 Arkansas's 2nd congressional district election
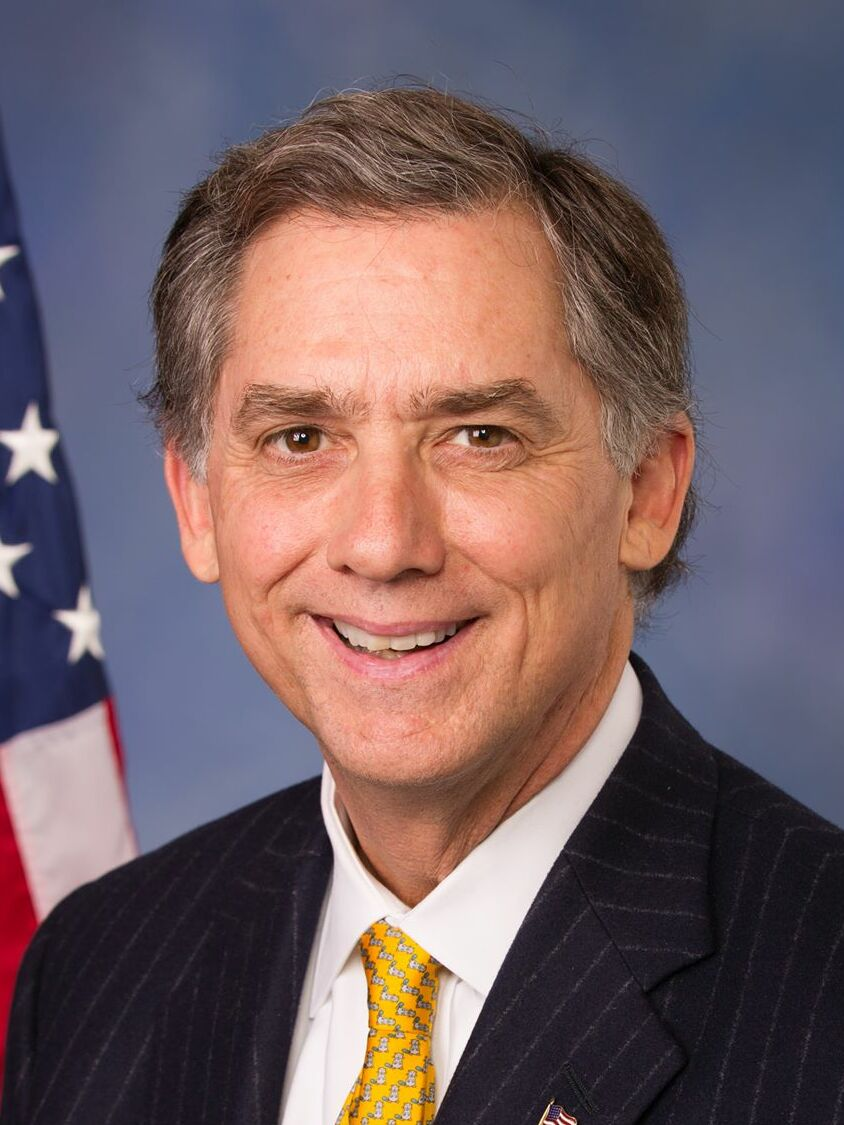

| Nominee | French Hill | Dianne Curry |
| Party | Republican | Democratic |
| Popular vote | 176,472 | 111,347 |
| Percentage | 58.3% | 36.8% |
- County results Hill: 60–70% 70–80% Curry: 40–50%
U.S. Representative before election
French Hill
Republican
Elected U.S. Representative
French Hill
Republican

Incumbent Republican French Hill, who had represented the district since 2015, ran for re-election. He was elected with 52% of the vote in 2014. The district had a PVI of R+8.

=== Republican primary ===
==== Candidates ====
===== Nominee =====
- French Hill, incumbent U.S. Representative

===== Eliminated in primary =====
- Brock Olree

==== Results ====
Results by county Hill: 80–90%

Republican primary results
| Party | Candidate | Votes | % |
|---|---|---|---|
| Republican | French Hill (incumbent) | 86,474 | 84.5 |
| Republican | Brock Olree | 15,811 | 15.5 |
| Total votes | | 102,285 | 100.0 |

=== Democratic primary ===
==== Candidates ====
===== Nominee =====
- Dianne Curry, former member of the Little Rock School Board and the Arkansas Division of Volunteerism

=== Libertarian primary ===
==== Candidates ====
===== Nominee =====
- Chris Hayes, nominee for this seat in 2012 and for State Treasurer in 2014

=== General election ===
==== Predictions ====
| Source | Ranking | As of |
|---|---|---|
| The Cook Political Report | Safe R | November 7, 2016 |
| Daily Kos Elections | Safe R | November 7, 2016 |
| Rothenberg | Safe R | November 3, 2016 |
| Sabato's Crystal Ball | Safe R | November 7, 2016 |
| RCP | Safe R | October 31, 2016 |

==== Results ====
2016 Arkansas's 2nd congressional district election
| Party | Candidate | Votes | % |
|---|---|---|---|
| Republican | French Hill (incumbent) | 176,472 | 58.3 |
| Democratic | Dianne Curry | 111,347 | 36.8 |
| Libertarian | Chris Hayes | 14,342 | 4.7 |
| Write-in | | 303 | 0.1 |
| Total votes | | 302,464 | 100.0 |
| Republican hold | | | |

==== By county ====
| County | French Hill Republican | | Dianne Curry Democratic | | Various candidates Other parties | | Margin | | Total |
| County | # | % | # | % | # | % | # | % | Total |
|---|---|---|---|---|---|---|---|---|---|
| Conway | 4,985 | 63.46% | 2,539 | 32.32% | 331 | 4.21% | 2,446 | 31.14% | 7,855 |
| Faulkner | 30,575 | 65.73% | 13,314 | 28.62% | 2,627 | 5.65% | 17,261 | 37.11% | 46,516 |
| Perry | 3,014 | 71.49% | 953 | 22.60% | 249 | 5.91% | 2,061 | 48.89% | 4,216 |
| Pulaski | 74,291 | 47.15% | 76,522 | 48.57% | 6,744 | 4.28% | -2,231 | -1.42% | 157,557 |
| Saline | 36,960 | 71.75% | 11,778 | 22.87% | 2,772 | 5.38% | 25,182 | 48.89% | 51,510 |
| Van Buren | 5,243 | 72.65% | 1,535 | 21.27% | 439 | 6.08% | 3,708 | 51.38% | 7,217 |
| White | 21,404 | 77.57% | 4,706 | 17.06% | 1,483 | 5.37% | 16,698 | 60.52% | 27,593 |
| Totals | 176,472 | 58.34% | 111,347 | 36.81% | 14,645 | 4.84% | 65,125 | 21.53% | 302,464 |

== District 3 ==
2016 Arkansas's 3rd congressional district election
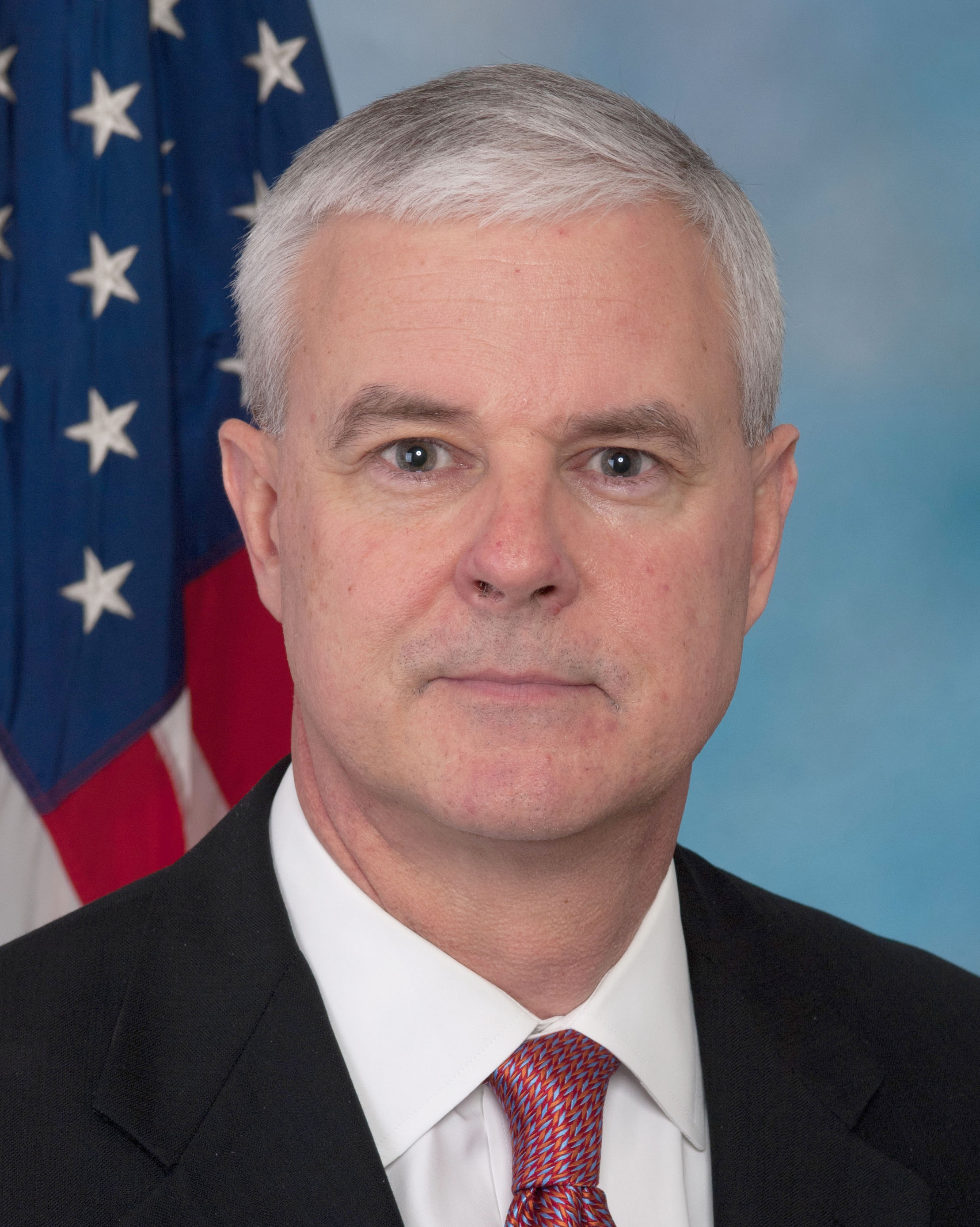

| Nominee | Steve Womack | Steve Isaacson |
| Party | Republican | Libertarian |
| Popular vote | 217,192 | 63,715 |
| Percentage | 77.3% | 22.7% |
- County results Womack: 70–80% 80–90% 90–100%
U.S. Representative before election
Steve Womack
Republican
Elected U.S. Representative
Steve Womack
Republican

Incumbent Republican Steve Womack, who had represented the district since 2011, ran for re-election. He was re-elected with 79% of the vote in 2014. The district had a PVI of R+19.

=== Republican primary ===
==== Candidates ====
===== Nominee =====
- Steve Womack, incumbent U.S. Representative

=== Democratic primary ===
There was no Democratic nominee for this election for the third consecutive time in Arkansas's third congressional district (including redistricting).

==== Candidates ====
===== Declined =====
- Robbie Wilson, tax preparer

=== Libertarian primary ===
==== Candidates ====
===== Nominee =====
- Steve Isaacson

===== Withdrawn =====
- Nathan LaFrance, nominee for U.S. Senate in 2014

=== General election ===
==== Predictions ====
| Source | Ranking | As of |
|---|---|---|
| The Cook Political Report | Safe R | November 7, 2016 |
| Daily Kos Elections | Safe R | November 7, 2016 |
| Rothenberg | Safe R | November 3, 2016 |
| Sabato's Crystal Ball | Safe R | November 7, 2016 |
| RCP | Safe R | October 31, 2016 |

==== Debate ====
2016 Arkansas's 3rd congressional district debate
| No. | Date | Host | Moderator | Link | Republican | Libertarian |
| Key: P Participant A Absent N Not invited I Invited W Withdrawn | | | | | | |
| Key: P Participant A Absent N Not invited I Invited W Withdrawn | | | | | Steve Womack | Steve Isaacson |
|---|---|---|---|---|---|---|
| 1 | | Arkansas PBS | Steve Barnes | | P | P |

==== Results ====
2016 Arkansas's 3rd congressional district election
| Party | Candidate | Votes | % |
|---|---|---|---|
| Republican | Steve Womack (incumbent) | 217,192 | 77.3 |
| Libertarian | Steve Isaacson | 63,715 | 22.7 |
| Total votes | | 280,907 | 100.0 |
| Republican hold | | | |

==== By county ====
| County | Steve Womack Republican | | Steve Isaacson Libertarian | | Margin | | Total |
| County | # | % | # | % | # | % | Total |
|---|---|---|---|---|---|---|---|
| Benton | 73,289 | 78.18% | 20,453 | 21.82% | 52,836 | 56.36% | 93,742 |
| Boone | 13,369 | 86.19% | 2,142 | 13.81% | 11,227 | 72.38% | 15,511 |
| Carroll | 7,477 | 73.86% | 2,646 | 26.14% | 4,831 | 47.72% | 10,123 |
| Crawford (part) | 13,152 | 84.16% | 2,475 | 15.84% | 10,677 | 68.32% | 15,627 |
| Marion | 5,601 | 82.72% | 1,170 | 17.28% | 4,431 | 65.44% | 6,771 |
| Newton (part) | 1,451 | 87.04% | 216 | 12.96% | 1,235 | 74.09% | 1,667 |
| Pope | 18,123 | 82.80% | 3,765 | 17.20% | 14,358 | 65.60% | 21,888 |
| Searcy (part) | 208 | 92.44% | 17 | 7.56% | 191 | 84.89% | 225 |
| Sebastian (part) | 29,638 | 77.36% | 8,673 | 22.64% | 20,965 | 54.72% | 38,311 |
| Washington | 54,884 | 71.24% | 22,158 | 28.76% | 32,726 | 42.48% | 77,042 |
| Totals | 217,192 | 77.32% | 63,715 | 22.68% | 153,477 | 54.64% | 280,907 |

== District 4 ==
2016 Arkansas's 4th congressional district election
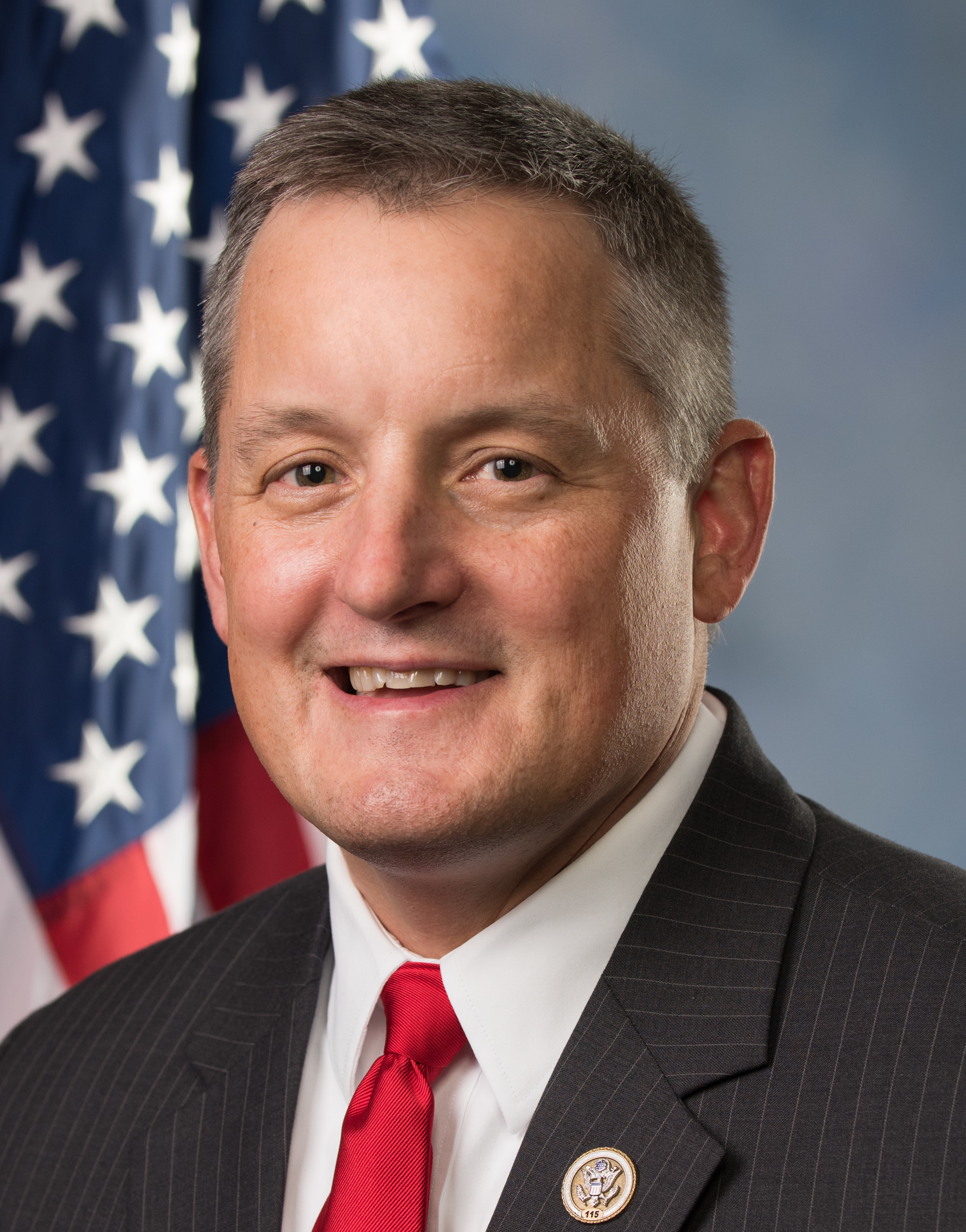

| Nominee | Bruce Westerman | Kerry Hicks |
| Party | Republican | Libertarian |
| Popular vote | 182,885 | 61,274 |
| Percentage | 74.9% | 25.1% |
- County results Westerman: 50–60% 60–70% 70–80% 80–90%
U.S. Representative before election
Bruce Westerman
Republican
Elected U.S. Representative
Bruce Westerman
Republican

Incumbent Republican Bruce Westerman, who had represented the district since 2015, ran for re-election. He was elected with 54% of the vote in 2014. The district had a PVI of R+15.

=== Republican primary ===
==== Candidates ====
===== Nominee =====
- Bruce Westerman, incumbent U.S. Representative

=== Democratic primary ===
There was no Democratic nominee for this election.

=== Libertarian primary ===
==== Candidates ====
===== Nominee =====
- Kerry Hicks

=== General election ===
==== Predictions ====
| Source | Ranking | As of |
|---|---|---|
| The Cook Political Report | Safe R | November 7, 2016 |
| Daily Kos Elections | Safe R | November 7, 2016 |
| Rothenberg | Safe R | November 3, 2016 |
| Sabato's Crystal Ball | Safe R | November 7, 2016 |
| RCP | Safe R | October 31, 2016 |

==== Results ====
2016 Arkansas's 4th congressional district election
| Party | Candidate | Votes | % |
|---|---|---|---|
| Republican | Bruce Westerman (incumbent) | 182,885 | 74.9 |
| Libertarian | Kerry Hicks | 61,274 | 25.1 |
| Total votes | | 244,159 | 100.0 |
| Republican hold | | | |

==== By county ====
| County | Bruce Westerman Republican | | Kerry Hicks Libertarian | | Margin | | Total |
| County | # | % | # | % | # | % | Total |
|---|---|---|---|---|---|---|---|
| Ashley | 5,568 | 76.06% | 1,753 | 23.94% | 3,815 | 52.11% | 7,321 |
| Bradley | 2,441 | 75.29% | 801 | 24.71% | 1,640 | 50.59% | 3,242 |
| Calhoun | 1,583 | 79.11% | 418 | 20.89% | 1,165 | 58.22% | 2,001 |
| Clark | 5,207 | 68.32% | 2,414 | 31.68% | 2,793 | 36.65% | 7,621 |
| Cleveland | 2,597 | 83.48% | 514 | 16.52% | 2,083 | 66.96% | 3,111 |
| Columbia | 5,634 | 73.97% | 1,983 | 26.03% | 3,651 | 47.93% | 7,617 |
| Crawford (part) | 4,767 | 80.69% | 1,141 | 19.31% | 3,626 | 61.37% | 5,908 |
| Dallas | 1,668 | 69.21% | 742 | 30.79% | 926 | 38.42% | 2,410 |
| Drew | 4,226 | 72.51% | 1,602 | 27.49% | 2,624 | 45.02% | 5,828 |
| Franklin | 4,846 | 80.96% | 1,140 | 19.04% | 3,706 | 61.91% | 5,986 |
| Garland | 29,596 | 76.81% | 8,936 | 23.19% | 20,660 | 53.62% | 38,532 |
| Grant | 5,786 | 81.73% | 1,293 | 18.27% | 4,493 | 63.47% | 7,079 |
| Hempstead | 4,720 | 76.62% | 1,440 | 23.38% | 3,280 | 53.25% | 6,160 |
| Hot Spring | 8,474 | 76.16% | 2,652 | 23.84% | 5,822 | 52.33% | 11,126 |
| Howard | 3,312 | 80.49% | 803 | 19.51% | 2,509 | 60.97% | 4,115 |
| Jefferson (part) | 11,101 | 51.65% | 10,390 | 48.35% | 711 | 3.31% | 21,491 |
| Johnson | 6,286 | 74.92% | 2,104 | 25.08% | 4,182 | 49.85% | 8,390 |
| Lafayette | 1,875 | 74.32% | 648 | 25.68% | 1,227 | 48.63% | 2,523 |
| Little River | 3,623 | 77.73% | 1,038 | 22.27% | 2,585 | 55.46% | 4,661 |
| Logan | 5,997 | 79.85% | 1,513 | 20.15% | 4,484 | 59.71% | 7,510 |
| Madison | 4,853 | 76.17% | 1,518 | 23.83% | 3,335 | 52.35% | 6,371 |
| Miller | 11,344 | 77.03% | 3,382 | 22.97% | 7,962 | 54.07% | 14,726 |
| Montgomery | 2,693 | 81.24% | 622 | 18.76% | 2,071 | 62.47% | 3,315 |
| Nevada | 2,036 | 71.24% | 822 | 28.76% | 1,214 | 42.48% | 2,858 |
| Newton (part) | 1,412 | 77.16% | 418 | 22.84% | 994 | 54.32% | 1,830 |
| Ouachita | 5,955 | 70.27% | 2,520 | 29.73% | 3,435 | 40.53% | 8,475 |
| Pike | 3,151 | 84.77% | 566 | 15.23% | 2,585 | 69.55% | 3,717 |
| Polk | 6,440 | 83.30% | 1,291 | 16.70% | 5,149 | 66.60% | 7,731 |
| Scott | 2,775 | 83.48% | 549 | 16.52% | 2,226 | 66.97% | 3,324 |
| Sebastian (part) | 4,252 | 82.26% | 917 | 17.74% | 3,335 | 64.52% | 5,169 |
| Sevier | 3,463 | 82.16% | 752 | 17.84% | 2,711 | 64.32% | 4,215 |
| Union | 10,305 | 75.21% | 3,397 | 24.79% | 6,908 | 50.42% | 13,702 |
| Yell | 4,899 | 80.39% | 1,195 | 19.61% | 3,704 | 60.78% | 6,094 |
| Totals | 182,885 | 74.90% | 61,274 | 25.10% | 121,611 | 49.81% | 244,159 |

== See also ==
- United States House of Representatives elections, 2016
- United States elections, 2016
