= Libertarian Party of Arkansas =

State affiliate of the Libertarian Party

- Abbreviation: LPAR
- Chairperson: Michael Pakko
- Founded: 1971; 55 years ago
- Membership (2021): 690
- Ideology: Libertarianism
- Senate: 0 / 35
- House of Representatives: 0 / 100
- U.S. Senate: 0 / 2
- U.S. House of Representatives: 0 / 4
- Other elected officials: 3 (April 2025)

Website
- lpar.org

The Libertarian Party of Arkansas (LPAR) is the Arkansas affiliate of the national Libertarian Party (LP). In the 2010s the party saw increased support in federal races due to a lack of Democratic candidates contesting those races.

== History ==
In 2002 members of the party petitioned to place Amendment 3, a ballot initiative that would have eliminated taxes on food and medicine, but it was overwhelming rejected by 61% to 39%. The sales tax on food was later phased out through the passage of a bill.

They first achieved official party status to run candidates for office in the 2012 election. They have fielded a candidate in every general election since. They have had continuous ballot access since 2012.

In March 2019 the party filed a lawsuit to challenge the move from requiring 10,000 signatures to nearly 27,000 (3% of the total votes cast in the state’s last gubernatorial election) for whole-ballot access. By June 2020 the Eighth Circuit court had ruled the change likely unconstitutional.

== Electoral performance ==
=== Presidential ===
Year	Presidential nominee	Votes	Change
1980	Ed Clark	8,970 (1.1%)	Steady
1984	David Bergland	2,221 (0.3%)	▼0.8%
1988	Ron Paul	3,297 (0.4%)	▼0.2%
1992	Andre Marrou	1,261 (0.1%)	▼0.3%
1996	Harry Browne	3,076 (0.4%)	▲0.2%
2000	Harry Browne	2,781 (0.3%)	▼0.1%
2004	Michael Badnarik	2,345 (0.2%)	▼0.1%
2008	Bob Barr	4,776 (0.4%)	▲0.2%
2012	Gary Johnson	16,276 (1.5%)	▲1.1%
2016	Gary Johnson	29,829 (2.6%)	▲1.1%
2020	Jo Jorgensen	13,133 (1.1%)	▼1.6%
2024	Chase Oliver	5,715 (0.5%)	▼0.6%

=== Senate Class II ===
Year	Senate nominee	Votes	Change
2014	Nathan LaFrance	17,210 (2.0%)	Steady
2020	Ricky Dale Harrington Jr.	399,390 (33.5%)	▲31.4%

=== Senate Class III ===
Year	Senate nominee	Votes	Change
2010	Trevor Drown	25,234 (3.2%)	Steady
2016	Frank Gilbert	43,866 (4.0%)	▲0.7%
2022	Kenneth Cates	28,682 (3.2%)	▼0.8%

=== Gubernatorial ===
Year	Gubernatorial nominee	Votes	Change
2014	Frank Gilbert	16,319 (1.9%)	Steady
2018	Mark West	25,885 (2.9%)	▲1.0%
2022	Ricky Dale Harrington Jr.	16,690 (1.8%)	▼ -1.1%

=== House ===
Year	Number of candidates	Votes	Change
2012	4	37,987 (3.7%)	Steady
2014	4	66,055 (8.0%)	▲4.3%
2016	4	196,512 (18.4%)	▲10.4%
2018	4	19,625 (2.2%)	▼16.2%
2020	2	20,645 (1.8%)	▼0.4%
2022	3	25,331 (2.8%)	▲1.0%
2024	2	21,668 (1.9%)	▼0.9%

== See also ==
- Political party strength in Arkansas
- List of state parties of the Libertarian Party
