= Pat Hays =

American politician (1947–2023)

23rd Mayor of North Little Rock, Arkansas
- In office 1989–2013
- Preceded by: Terry Hartwick
- Succeeded by: Joe Smith

Member of the Arkansas House of Representatives from the 66th district
- In office 1987–1989

Personal details
- Born: January 8, 1947 North Little Rock, Arkansas, U.S.
- Died: October 4, 2023 (aged 76)
- Party: Democratic
- Spouse: Linda
- Children: 1
- Education: University of Arkansas
- Profession: Lawyer

Military service
- Branch/service: United States Army
- Rank: Captain
- Unit: Army Reserves

Patrick Henry Hays (January 8, 1947 – October 4, 2023) was an American lawyer and politician from the state of Arkansas. A member of the Democratic Party, he served in the Arkansas House of Representatives from 1987 to 1989 and as the mayor of North Little Rock from 1989 to 2013. Hays was the Democratic nominee for Arkansas's 2nd congressional district in the 2014 elections to the United States House of Representatives.

== Early life and education ==
Patrick Henry Hays was born in North Little Rock, Arkansas, on January 8, 1947. He graduated from North Little Rock High School, and then attended the University of Arkansas at Fayetteville, where he obtained his bachelor's degree. He received his Juris Doctor from the University of Arkansas School of Law. Hays joined the United States Army Reserves, reaching the rank of captain.

== Career ==
Hays served as assistant city attorney for North Little Rock. He was elected to the Arkansas House of Representatives in the 66th district for the 76th Arkansas General Assembly, which was in session from 1987 through 1989. He was then elected mayor of North Little Rock, and served six terms, from 1989 through 2013, totaling 24 years. During his tenure as mayor, he pushed for a one cent sales tax to fund the construction of Dickey-Stephens Park. He also oversaw the development of the Big Dam Bridge, Clinton Park Bridge, Broadway Bridge, and Burns Park.

Hays briefly ran for the United States Senate following the retirement of David Pryor and Dale Bumpers in the 1996 election and the 1998 election, but he withdrew his candidacy both times due to the inability to keep pace racing the money needed to make a competitive race. In 1996 he supported in the primary fellow attorney and good friend Sandy McMath and in 1998, when McMath withdrew from a second bid, he supported Blanche Lambert Lincoln who went onto win. He was considered a potential candidate in the 2010 Attorney General race though chose not to run and 2012 election for the United States House of Representatives in Arkansas's 2nd congressional district, but opted not to run. Hays did not seek reelection as mayor in 2012.

Hays announced his candidacy for the House of Representatives to succeed Republican incumbent Tim Griffin in the 2014 election on October 22, 2013. He cited the 2013 United States federal government shutdown, which he called a "travesty", as a reason to run. Republican French Hill defeated Hays in the general election.

== Personal life ==
Hays' wife, Linda, worked as a schoolteacher. They had a daughter.

Hays died on October 4, 2023, at age 76, due to cancer.

== See also ==
- List of mayors of North Little Rock, Arkansas
