= Beth Anne Rankin =

American politician

Member-elect of the Arkansas House of Representatives from the 99th district
- Assuming office January 11, 2027
- Succeeding: Lane Jean

Personal details
- Party: Republican
- Education: Ouachita Baptist University
- Website: Campaign website

Beth Anne Rankin Baker is an American politician. A member of the Republican Party, she is the member-elect for the 99th district of the Arkansas House of Representatives. She was elected in the 2026 election. She was a candidate for Arkansas's 4th congressional district in 2010, 2012 and 2014. She served as a policy adviser and director of state-federal affairs for Governor Mike Huckabee. She was named Miss Arkansas in 1994.
