= Chris Thomason =

American politician (born 1972)

- In office August 1, 2008 – March 10th, 2020
- Chancellor: University of Arkansas Hope-Texarkana
- Preceded by: Charles L. Welch

Prosecuting Attorney for the Eighth North Judicial Circuit of Arkansas
- In office January 1, 2007 – August 1, 2008

Member of the Arkansas House of Representatives from the 3rd district
- In office January 2003 – January 2007
- Preceded by: Cecile Bledsoe
- Succeeded by: David "Bubba" Powers

Personal details
- Born: Steven Christopher Thomason; December 30, 1972 (age 53) Bowie County, Texas
- Party: Democratic
- Spouse: Penny
- Education: University of Arkansas at Little Rock (BA, JD)
- Occupation: University Administrator and Lawyer

Steven Christopher Thomason (born December 30, 1972) is an American lawyer, former Arkansas state representative, former prosecutor, former chancellor of the University of Arkansas Community College at Hope, and current University of Arkansas System Vice President for Planning and Development.

== Personal life and education ==
He is the son of Harland E. and Suzanne Cox Thomason.

He graduated from Hope High School in Hope, Arkansas in 1991.

He earned a Bachelor of Arts in Criminal Justice from the University of Arkansas at Little Rock in 1995 and a Juris Doctor from the William H. Bowen School of Law in 1998.

== Career ==
Thomason practiced law in Hope in 1998 and later became a member of the Wright, Burke, Thomason and Graham Law Firm until the end of 2002. In 2003, he opened his own private practice law office in Hope.

He served as the deputy prosecuting attorney for Arkansas's 8th Judicial Circuit North from 1999-2002, and served as the prosecuting attorney from 2006-2008. In between his two stints as a prosecutor, he served two terms in the Arkansas House of Representatives (2003-2007) holding legislative leadership positions included chairing the Rail and Mass Transit Subcommittee and the Joint Performance Review Committee. Thomason became chancellor of the University of Arkansas Community College at Hope in 2008.

Thomason has been mentioned as a potential candidate for Arkansas's 4th congressional district and for governor.

== Awards and honors ==
In 2018, Thomason was named Hempstead County Educator of the Year by the Hope–Hempstead County Chamber of Commerce. His earlier recognitions include the Arkansas Prosecuting Attorneys Association’s Advocate of Justice Award, the Advance Practice Nurses Council’s Advocate of the Year award, and recognition as a Champion for Children by Arkansas Advocates for Children and Families. In 2003, the Arkansas Democrat-Gazette named him among its “Top Ten Legislators.”
