= Herb Rule =

American politician (1937–2023)

- Born: 1935/1936; Little Rock, Arkansas, U.S.
- Died: April 3, 2023 (aged 87)
- Citizenship: United States
- Education: Bachelor of Arts (Yale), Juris Doctor(University of Arkansas)
- Alma mater: Yale, UA Fayetteville
- Occupation: Candidate for US House of Representatives
- Organization: Arkansas Bar Association
- Known for: Marriage equality, Little Rock School Board, Arkansas House of Representatives
- Political party: Democratic
- Opponent: Tim Griffin
- Children: 2
- Parent(s): Dora and Herbert C. Rule Jr.
- Website: http://RuleForCongress.com (Defunct)

Herbert C. Rule III (1935/1936 – April 3, 2023) was an American politician and lawyer who was a member of the Arkansas House of Representatives.

== Early life ==
Rule was born in Little Rock, Arkansas. He was the second of three children.

== Education and military service ==
Attending Little Rock schools he graduated from Central High School in 1955, receiving an NROTC scholarship to attend Yale University where he earned his Bachelor of Arts in 1959. Herb entered active duty as a Marine with the 3rd Marine Division serving in the Far East. After his tour of duty, he served an additional six years in the Marine Corps Reserve while attending the University of Arkansas at Fayetteville where he graduated third in his class in 1964 with his juris doctor and passing the Arkansas Bar in the same year.

== Advocacies ==
Long time advocate for homeless veterans and has been active over the years as noted in the Fall 2008 Justice Report and more recently from the February 29 meeting regarding the Veterans' Home on Main Street in Little Rock.
Stands on marriage equality.

== Career ==
As a member of Rose Law Firm from 1964 to 2012, Herb practiced law in the areas of utility rate regulation, environmental, labor, bankruptcy, real estate and commercial lending and litigation, oil and gas, and eminent domain. In his 48-year legal career, Herb has tried over 100 trials, 65 appeals and has appeared before the Arkansas Supreme Court.

Rule was elected to the Arkansas House of Representatives in 1966 when he defeated Paul Van Dalsem.

In addition to his legal career and political career, Rule has farmed soybeans, rice and corn near Keo, Arkansas; has been a real estate developer; co-owned a restaurant; and was a board member and stockholder of a plywood startup company in the Arkansas delta. His public service includes serving two terms in the Arkansas General Assembly and six years on the Little Rock School Board where he led the school modernization.

== Death ==
Rule died on April 3, 2023, at the age of 87.
