= Gene Jeffress =

American politician

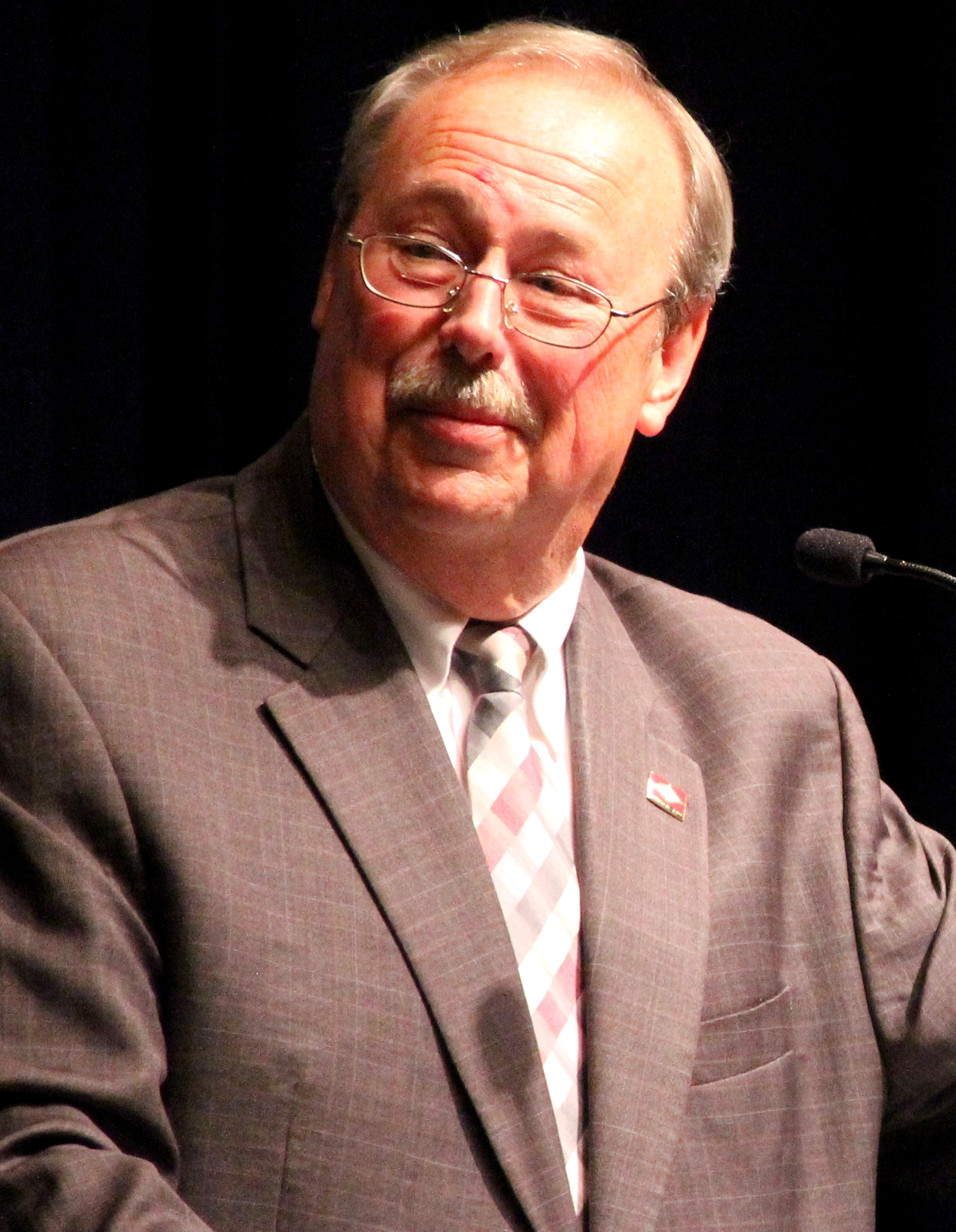

Member of the Arkansas Senate from the 25th district
- In office 2003–2013
- Succeeded by: Stephanie Flowers

Arkansas House of Representatives
- In office 1999–2003

Personal details
- Born: October 18, 1948 (age 77)
- Party: Democratic
- Occupation: teacher
- Website: Jeffress for Congress

Harmon "Gene" Jeffress (born October 18, 1948) is an American politician. A member of the Democratic Party, he served as a member of the Arkansas Senate, representing District 25 from 2003 to 2013.

== Career ==
Jeffress earned his bachelor's degree in music education from the University of Arkansas, Monticello, in 1971. He is a former teacher.

Jeffres served in the Arkansas House of Representatives from 1999 to 2003. He joined the Arkansas Senate in 2003. He was ineligible to run for re-election to the State Senate in 2012 due to term limits.

Jeffress ran in the 2012 elections for the United States House of Representatives, representing Arkansas's 4th congressional district. He and Q. Byrum Hurst Jr. defeated D. C. Morrison in the May 22 Democratic primary and advanced to the June 12 primary runoff election. Jeffress defeated Hurst in the runoff and faced Republican Tom Cotton in the general election on November 6, 2012, losing the race to Cotton.

== Personal ==
Jeffress and his ex-wife, Cynthia, have three children. They reside in Louann, Arkansas. His brother, Jimmy Jeffress, was also a member of the Arkansas Senate.

Political offices
| Preceded by - | Arkansas State Senate District 25; 2003–2013 | Succeeded by Stephanie Flowers |
