= University of Arkansas Hope-Texarkana =

Community college in Arkansas, U.S.

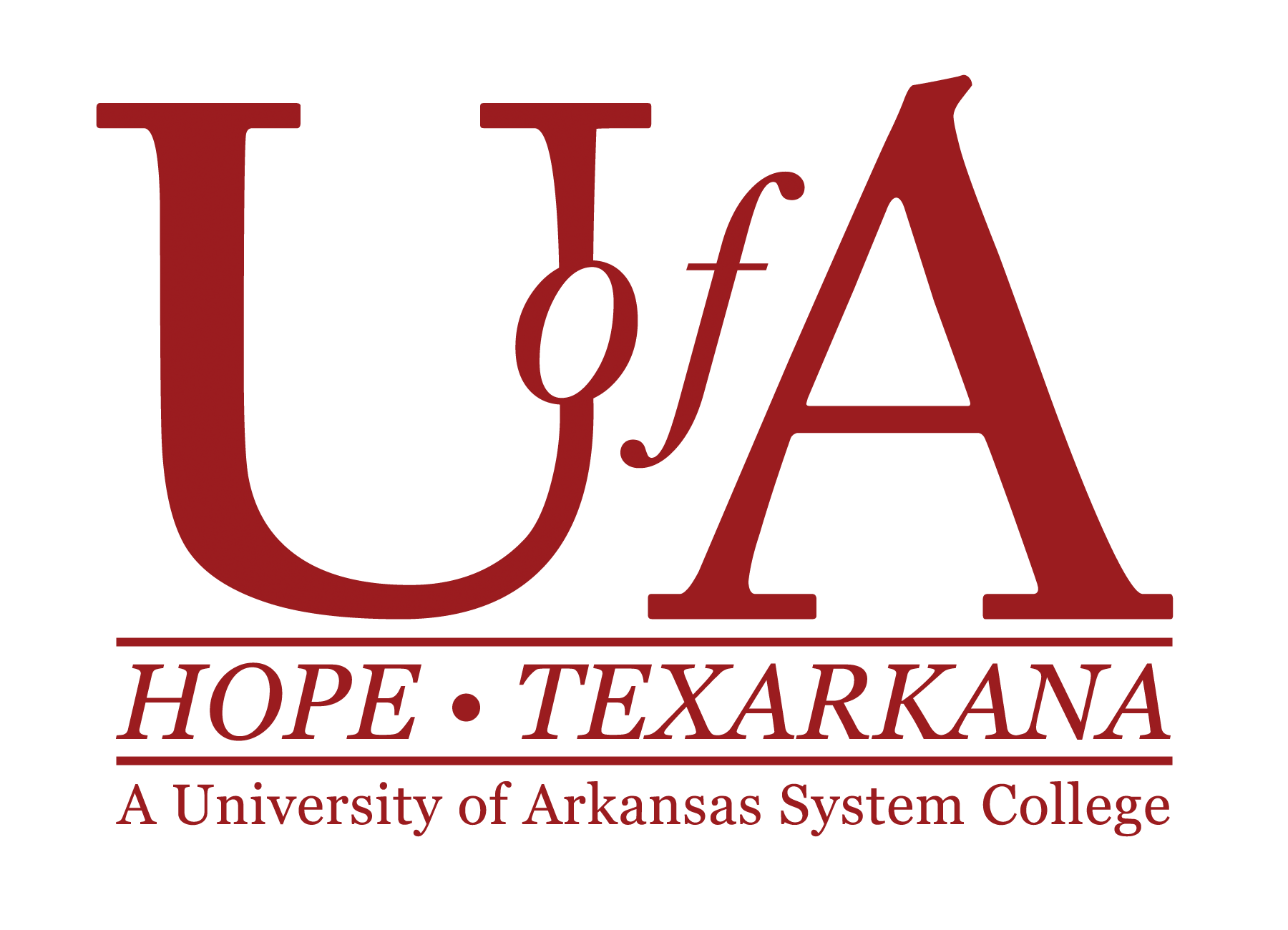
- Former names: Red River Vocational-Technical School; Red River Technical College; University of Arkansas Community College at Hope
- Motto: Your Bridge to the Future
- Type: Public community college
- Established: 1965
- Affiliations: University of Arkansas System
- Chancellor: Christine Holt
- Undergraduates: 1,188
- Location: Hope & Texarkana, Arkansas; 33.64180°N 93.59632°W
- Mascot: Iron Horse
- Website: www.uaht.edu

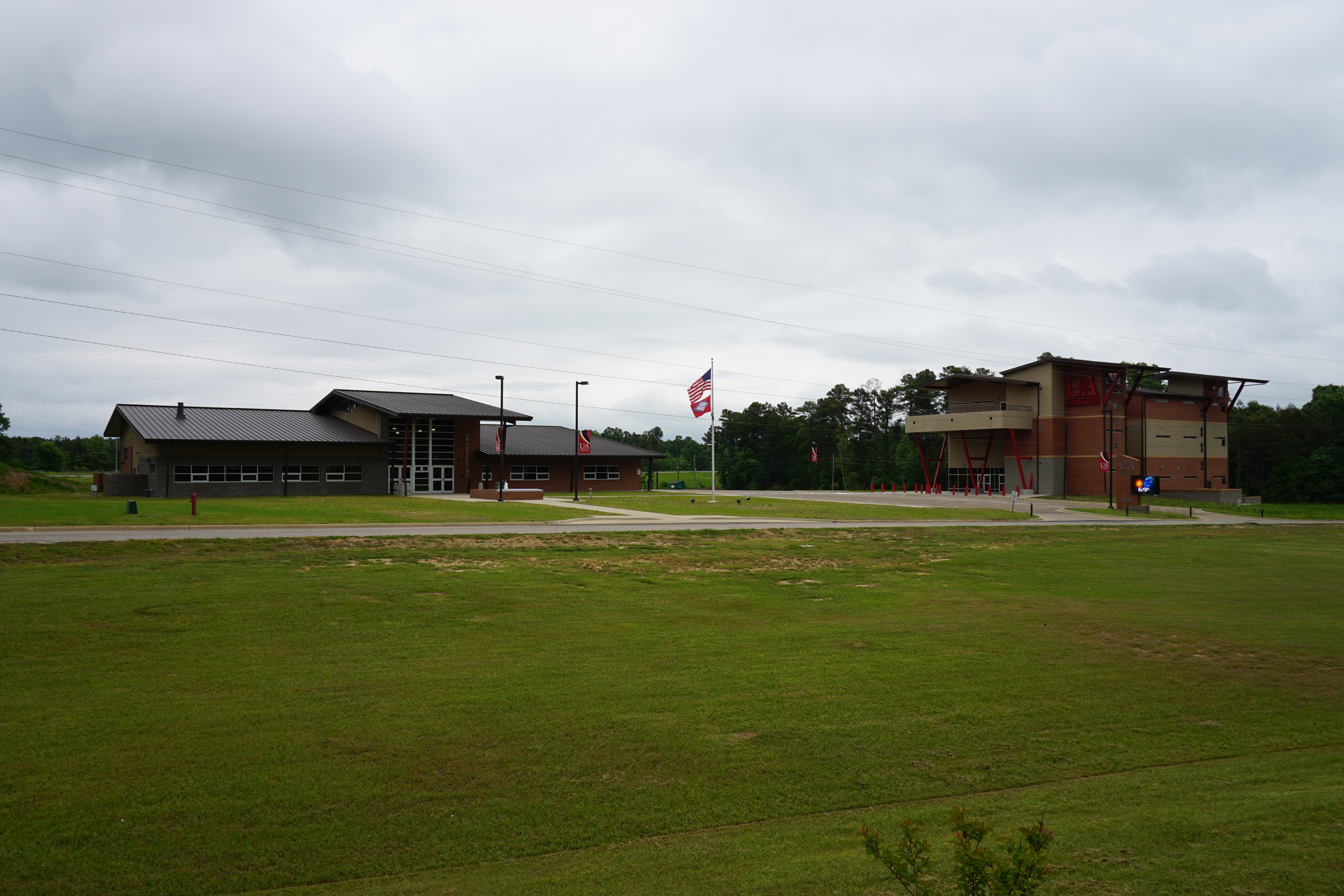
U of A Texarkana

The University of Arkansas Hope-Texarkana (UAHT) is a public community college in Hope and Texarkana, Arkansas. It is affiliated with the University of Arkansas System as a result a merger by act of the Arkansas Legislature in 1995 and is accredited by the North Central Association of Colleges and Schools. UAHT is an open-access institution that enrolls over 1,500 students at its 2 campuses. The college is located on a 72-acre site originally obtained by the citizens of the area for Red River Vocational-Technical School, which was established in 1965.

== History ==
The college traces its roots to Red River Vocational-Technical School which was established in 1965. Red River operated as a vocational-technical school until June 30, 1991. On July 1, 1991, Red River Vocational-Technical School officially became Red River Technical College and operated under the guidelines of the Arkansas Department of Higher Education.

In 1995, the Arkansas Legislature passed an act that provided for the merger of state two-year colleges and universities. On March 5, 1996, the citizens of Hempstead County approved a 1/4-cent sales tax to support the expansion of the college. On July 1, 1996, Red River Technical College became a division of the University of Arkansas System and was renamed the University of Arkansas Community College at Hope.

In 2012, the college expanded its operation to include an instructional facility in Texarkana, Arkansas. The U of A Texarkana instructional site encompasses 22 acres. Red River operated as a vocational-technical school until June 30, 1991.

On July 1, 1991, Red River Vocational-Technical School officially became Red River Technical College and operated under the guidelines of the Arkansas Department of Higher Education. Four years later, the Arkansas Legislature passed an act that provided for the merger of state two-year colleges and universities. On March 5, 1996, the citizens of Hempstead County approved a 1/4-cent sales tax to support the expansion of the college. On July 1, 1996, Red River Technical College became a division of the University of Arkansas System and was renamed the University of Arkansas Community College at Hope.

In 2012, the college expanded its operation to include an instructional facility in Texarkana, Arkansas. The U of A Texarkana instructional site encompasses 22 acres.
