= Soil Dryness Index =

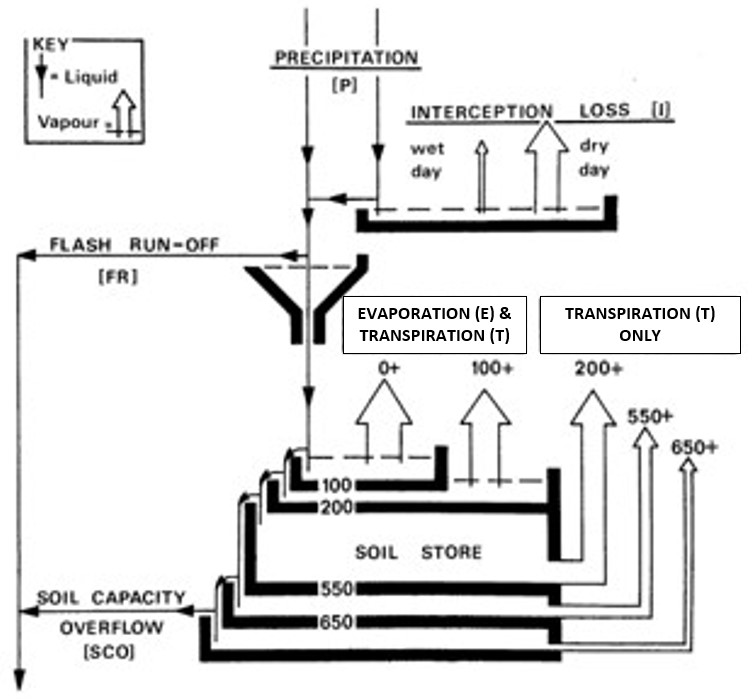
Figure 1. The water budget of the Soil Dryness Index (Mount 1972). This diagram uses points of rain to represent soil store capacity and the SDI (4 pts = ~1 mm).

The Soil Dryness Index (SDI) uses daily rainfall and maximum temperature from local meteorological stations to estimate soil dryness across tens of kilometers. It estimates the millimeters of rain needed to fill the soil with water (Mount 1972, 1980). The term was coined by Mount to focus attention on how useful a reliable measure of soil dryness is for flood and fire forecasting and management. Tasmanian government departments, businesses and land managers have used the SDI for these purposes for over 50 years and it is published daily by the Tasmanian Fire Service. Other states in Australia also make use of the SDI.

The model uses a water budget approach and assumes relatively simple mechanisms for the wetting and drying stages (Figure 1, Figure 2)

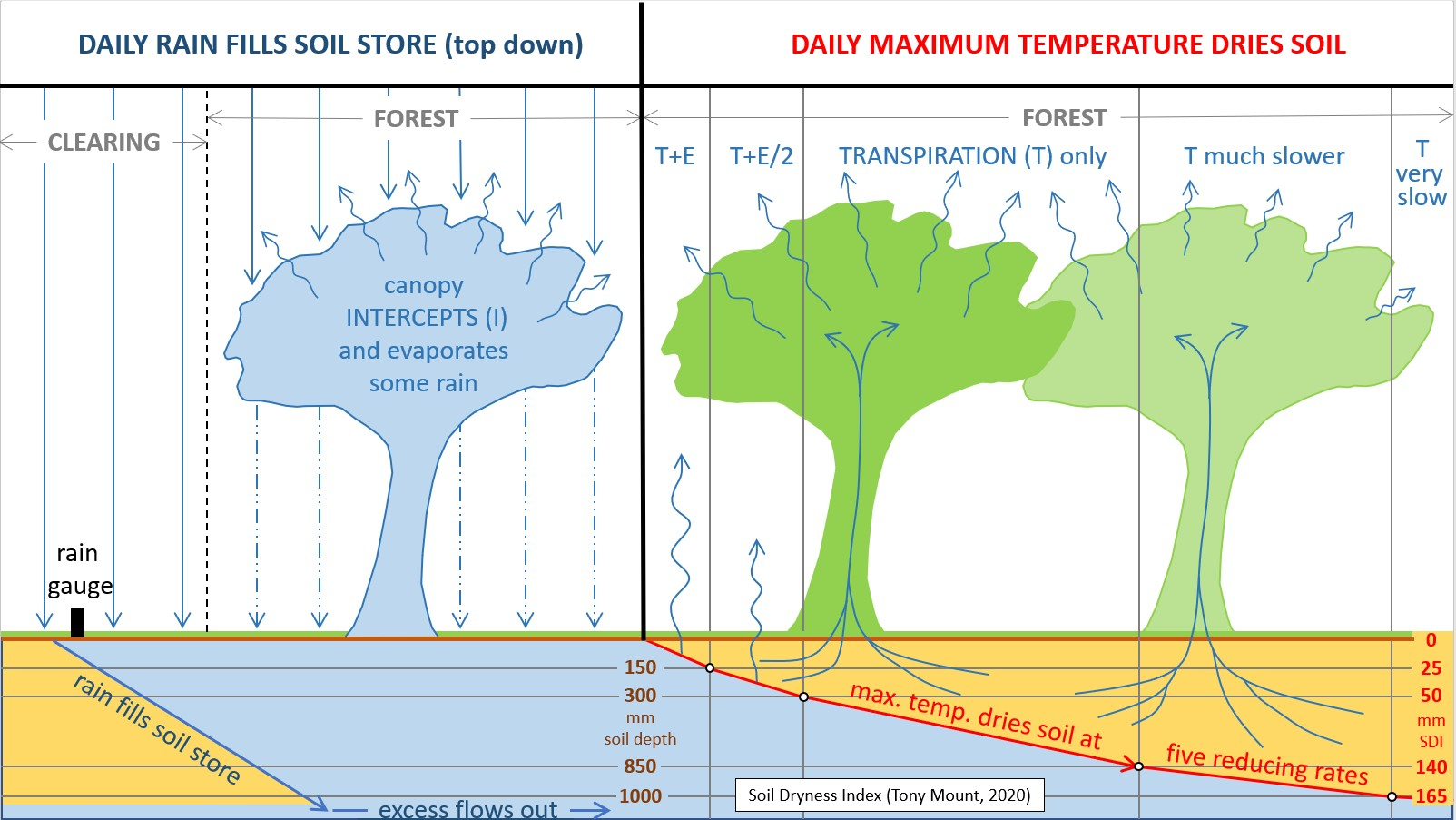
Figure 2. This simplified diagram shows daily rain wetting the soil from the top down faster than maximum temperature dries it; followed by rainless days where the daily maximum temperature dries the soil from the top down in five straight-line stages, by evaporation (E) from the soil's upper two layers, and by transpiration (T) from all five layers.

For the wetting stage, the rain falling on water, such as rivers and lakes, and marsh soils bypasses normal forest soils and produces flash run-off (FR). Some other rain is intercepted by and dried from forest canopies (I). The amount of rainfall going to flash run-off and canopy interception are taken off the daily rain gauge reading (P), to estimate how much rain reaches and wets forest soils. The model assumes each 150 mm of a typical meter-deep soil holds about 25 mm of rain. Run-off from full soils (SDI=0) is soil capacity overflow (SCO).

For the drying stage, both evaporation (E) from the soil and transpiration (T) through the plants are controlled by daily maximum temperature at five reducing rates (Keetch and Byram 1968; Mount 1972; Langford, Duncan and Heeps 1977; Burrows 1987).

== Application of the Soil Dryness index ==
The Tasmanian SDI has five soil drying stages that relate to forest dryness and flammability. The following are the SDI ranges used in Tasmania.

SDI (mm)	drying mechanism
0-25	Soils dry by transpiration (T) plus evaporation (E) from the top 15 cm of soil.
25-50	Transpiration plus nightly re-charge of the top 15 cm of soil by the 15 cm below.
50-140	All drying now is by transpiration.
140-165	Daytime leaf wilting, despite nightly recharge, causes reduced transpiration and lets the sun in to dry out fuels on the forest floor.
165-180	Day and night wilting causes the slowest drying of the driest soil. Drought deaths start to occur.

== See also ==
- Palmer drought index
- Keetch–Byram drought index
- Temperature Vegetation Water Stress Index (TVWSI)
