= DSCI =

DSCI may refer to:

- DSCI Corp., a United States telephone company
- Drought Severity and Coverage Index - an alternative to the Palmer drought index used by organisations including the United States Drought Monitor
- Data Security Council of India

== See also ==
- Defence School of Communications and Information Systems (DSCIS)
