= IPE =

Ipe or IPE may refer to:

== Science ==
=== Chemistry ===
- Icosapent ethyl, that is, ethyl eicosapentaenoic acid, an omega-3 lipid formulation
- Isopropyl ether, a chemical solvent, usually in the form of DIPE (diisopropyl ether)

=== Biology ===
- Ipê, trees in the genus Handroanthus and their wood
- iris pigment epithelium, a one-cell-thick layer of cuboidal cells lying behind the iris of the eye
- Immersion pulmonary edema, that is, swimming-induced pulmonary edema
- Interstitial pulmonary emphysema, that is, pulmonary interstitial emphysema, a rare lung condition in newborns

=== Physics ===
- Ideal polarized electrode, a type of ideal electrode

=== Mathematics ===
- Icosahedral prism, a type of polytope in geometry

== Institutions and organizations ==
- L’Institut pour I’Expertise (IPE), that is, IPE Management School Paris, a private higher education institution in Paris, France
- Institute of Public Enterprise in India
- International Petroleum Exchange (old name), that is, Intercontinental Exchange Futures (ICE Futures), a futures and options exchange
- International Petroleum Exposition, a former trade fair held periodically in Oklahoma from 1923 to 1979
- Pyrenean Ecology Institute (Instituto Pirenaico de Ecología), a research center from Spain

== Other uses ==
- International political economy, an academic discipline
- Integrity Policy Enforcement, a Linux Security Module (LSM) that enables additional security features
- Interprofessional education, integration of specialties in professional education
- Individual protective equipment, a type of personal protective equipment
- Île-du-Prince-Édouard, the French-language name of Prince Edward Island, a province of Canada
- Canal IPe, a Peruvian children's television channel
