= KBDI =

KBDI may refer to:

- KBDI-TV, a television station (channel 12) licensed to Broomfield, Colorado, United States
- Keetch-Byram Drought Index, a measure of drought conditions, and used to predict the likelihood of wildfires
