= United States Drought Monitor =

Collection of measures that allows experts to assess droughts in the US

The United States Drought Monitor is a collection of measures that allows experts to assess droughts in the United States. The monitor is not an agency but a partnership between the National Drought Mitigation Center (NDMC) at the University of Nebraska–Lincoln, the United States Department of Agriculture (USDA), and the National Oceanic and Atmospheric Administration (NOAA). Different experts provide their best judgment to outline a single map every week that shows droughts throughout the United States. The effort started in 1999 as a federal, state, and academic partnership, growing out of an initiative by the Western Governors Association (WGA) to provide timely and understandable scientific information on water supply and drought for policymakers.

The monitor is produced by a rotating group of authors and incorporates review from a group of 250 climatologists, extension agents, and others across the nation. Each week the authors revise the previous map based on rainfall, snowfall, and other events, and observers' reports of how drought is affecting crops, wildlife, and other indicators. Authors balance conflicting data and reports to come up with a new map every Wednesday afternoon. The map is then released on the following Thursday morning.

== See also ==
- Dust Bowl
- Evaporative Demand Drought Index
- National Integrated Drought Information System
- Palmer drought index
- Standardised Precipitation Evapotranspiration Index
- United States rainfall climatology
