= Weather and climate effects on Lyme disease exposure =

Lyme disease is spread to humans through the bite of infected ticks. The tick population is affected by weather and climate. Many factors determine tick population densities as well as diseased population densities of ticks so that no single factor can determine likelihood of exposure to tick-borne disease. Overall climate and primary host population determine the localities where ticks will thrive. However, studies have been conducted which correlate tick population to climate change and their behavior to weather patterns. Ticks are parasites which carry a myriad of infectious diseases that depend on the species of tick. Overall climate is more determinate of tick population and daily weather has a subtle effect on the spread of tick-borne disease. Being mindful of daily weather patterns and vigilantly avoiding exposure to ticks reduces human exposure to Lyme disease.

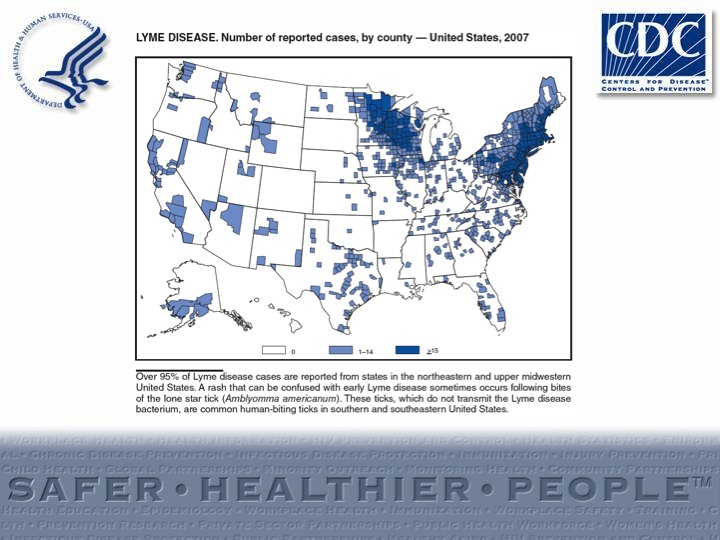
Lyme disease number of cases reported by county 2007

Peak summer weather July 2007. Warm humid air from the tropics meeting with cooler air over the eastern United States. Moisture condenses and forms clouds that trail up the Northeast illustrating the transfer of heat and humidity to the northeastern United States from equatorial waters. The cloud formations coincide with reported cases of Lyme from 2007.

== Tick entomology ==
After the larvae have fed, they drop off the host and molt to nymphs. The nymphs then overwinter and their activity almost completely ceases until late spring. They emerge the following year in May, June, and July. This emergence is just before the new generation of larvae hatch, allowing the nymphs to transmit tick-borne disease to new generations of hosts. This increases the possibility that the next generation of larvae will also become infected. Nymphs usually attach and feed on small mammals and birds. After feeding, nymphs drop off and molt to adults that will reappear in the fall of the same year. Adults seek medium to large mammalian hosts, primarily deer. Once adulthood is reached, ticks no longer hibernate during the winter and may become active on warm winter days.

== Climate ==
The incidence of Lyme disease is tied to many factors including climate. Certain regions worldwide supply the proper conditions for ticks to flourish. Ticks like habitats with at least 85% humidity and can only practice host questing at temperatures greater than 7 °C (45 °F). In order to find microclimates that are suitable ticks will use thermoreceptors to detect these proper conditions. One region with especially suitable climate for ticks is the northeastern United States. This region is part of a temperate and humid zone presenting the ideal conditions for tick survival. Warmer temperatures that are favourable for plant growth create an ideal condition for vegetation to thrive and these temperatures are beginning to arise in earlier spring due to climate change. This can lead to earlier tick emergence and questing behaviour which in return allows for extended periods of human-tick interactions.

=== Climate change ===
Climate change could affect ticks in a variety of ways. Süss et al. (2008) lists the following as possible changes to tick populations due to increased temperature brought on by global climate change:

1. an acceleration of the ticks' developmental cycle
2. an extension of the ticks' developmental cycle
3. an increase in egg production
4. an increase in population density
5. a shift in risk areas

Many of these changes could potentially increase the Lyme disease incidence and pose a threat to human populations, especially in the eastern half of the United States.

== Vegetation Growth ==
Vegetation levels in tick habitats affect tick behaviour and density of tick populations. Vegetation levels vary with the different seasons in terms of how dense and how much of it is present in tick habitats. Ticks thrive in environments with enough moisture to keep them sustained and far from desiccation. Habitats with more vegetation tend to contain more moisture as plants are constantly driving water into their roots from soil and transpiring that water within the atmosphere. Although precipitation heavily contributes to moisture levels, areas with more dense vegetation are able to retain that moisture more easily than deserted regions with less vegetation. Also, compacted undergrowth of vegetation allows for ticks to have shelter from environmental stressors like high temperatures and direct sunlight. It also provides a habitat in which the ticks can utilize their questing state to wait for a host to pass through. The density of vegetation and how it changes from Summer to Winter significantly affect tick populations. In the regions where the preferred tick habitats and vegetation are more prevalent, there is more opportunity for ticks to seek out hosts due to higher populations of ticks in those areas.

== Rainfall and temperature ==
In addition to climate, seasonal weather variations have a strong effect on tick populations. Changes in temperature and precipitation from year to year affect the Lyme disease incidence. Multiple studies have shown that there is a correlation between the amount of precipitation and the incidence of Lyme disease. After nymph ticks feed on and infect their host with Lyme disease they lose their ability to effectively control their water content. During a year with very little precipitation many ticks may die following feeding because of this loss of water regulatory control. These nymph ticks that have died out will never reach adulthood and lay eggs. Two years later their offspring nymph tick population will be reduced and thus Lyme disease incidence will also decrease. Schauber et al. (2005) also suggests a similar tie between lagged precipitation as measured by the Palmer Hydrologic Drought Index and Lyme disease incidence in the northeastern United States.

In addition to direct effects on nymph tick populations summer precipitation may also be a factor for controlling the population of the ticks' primary host – the white-footed mouse. Decreased rainfall in the summer months may also decrease the amount of vegetation available for mice populations to eat in order to sustain themselves during the winter. It thus follows that a decrease in rainfall may decrease the population of the ticks' primary host and thus reduce tick populations and Lyme disease incidence.

Subak (2003) proposes that a link between human behavior and precipitation could be another factor in Lyme disease incidence. In the northeastern United States when the summer weather is especially hot and dry, it may disincline people from outdoor activity. In fact, Subak (2003) found a link between dry conditions and a decreased Lyme disease incidence during late summer months in the northeast United States.

Temperature may also play a role in Lyme disease incidence. Schauber et al. (2005) found a positive correlation between the mean summer temperature and the rate of Lyme disease in the northeastern United States. Additionally, Subak (2003) suggests that there may also be a relationship between warmer winters and increased Lyme disease. This study discovered a tentative link between warmer winter weather lagged one year and Lyme disease incidence. A more moderate winter may increase the survival of the white-footed mouse host allowing for increased tick populations in the spring and summer. These warmer winter temperatures may also allow for more adult tick activity during winter and cause an increase in nymph populations the following year.

== Risk ==
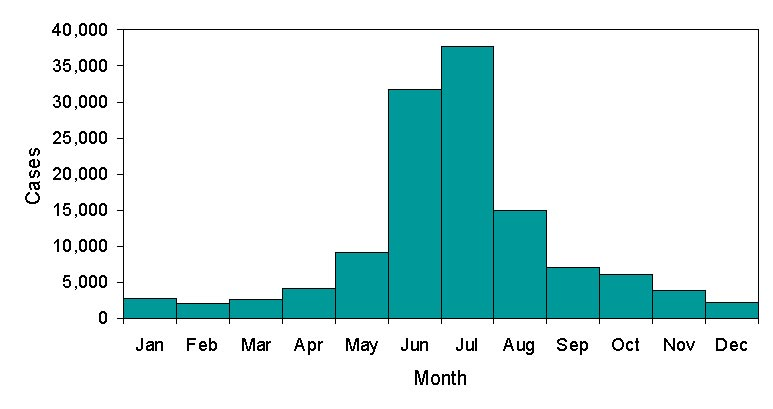
Reported Cases of Lyme Disease by Month of Illness Onset United States, 1992–2004

=== Vulnerability to Lyme ===
Outdoor activities tend to take place under fair weather conditions, which are those that ticks thrive in. Populations of the nymphal stage, the stage which most commonly transmits Lyme to humans, are highest during the late spring and early summer, directly preceding the months when greatest number of reported cases of Lyme disease occur.

Typical summer outerwear consists of shorter garments that enable ticks greater exposure to skin. Tick saliva has immunosuppressive properties that shut off the body's response, which would alert the body to the tick's presence. This allows ticks to remain attached for an extended period of time while feeding, increasing the probability of disease transmission.

=== Mitigating exposure ===
A number of different methods have been shown to mitigate exposure to Lyme disease. Individuals who practice diligence in ticks removal and exposure reduction techniques will be resilient to the risks of contracting Lyme disease, but further risk reduction can be attained by observance of the daily weather since ticks use a number of host seeking techniques that the weather can affect. ticks are able to detect hosts by their shadow. On bright sunny days, shadows contrast greatly with the surrounding brightly lit areas. Wearing light colored clothing on these days reduces risk of ticks exposure by reducing the contrast. Conducting outdoor activities on overcast or slightly foggy days also reduces shadow detection since contrast with the surroundings is minimized.

Ticks can detect the odor of a host. On breezy days remaining downwind from prime ticks habitats will minimize scent detection. Ticks seek hosts only at temperatures above 7 °C (45 °F). Risk of exposure at temperatures below these is extremely minimal.
