= Standardised Precipitation Evapotranspiration Index =

Multiscalar drought index based on climatic data

The Standardized Precipitation Evapotranspiration Index (SPEI) is a multiscalar drought index based on climatic data. It was developed by Vicente-Serrano et al. (2010) at the Pyrenean Institute of Ecology in Zaragoza, Spain. It can be used for determining the onset, duration and magnitude of drought conditions with respect to normal conditions in a variety of natural and managed systems such as crops, ecosystems, rivers, water resources, etc.

The SPEI accounts not only for precipitation deficit but also for the role of the increased atmospheric evaporative demand on drought severity. Evaporative demand is particularly dominant during periods of precipitation deficit. The SPEI calculation requires long-term and high-quality precipitation and atmospheric evaporative demand datasets. These can be obtained from ground stations or gridded data based on reanalysis as well as satellite and multi-source datasets.

== Datasets ==
Globally, the SPEIbase and Global Precipitation Climatology Centre (GPCC) drought index datasets are available at a relatively coarse spatial resolution. The SPEIbase is available at 0.5° resolution calculated from the Climatic Research Unit precipitation and potential evapotranspiration datasets. The GPCC drought index provides SPEI datasets at a 1.0° spatial resolution for limited timescales (1, 3, 6, 9, 12, 24, and 48 months).

Inputs to SPEI datasets can include high-resolution potential evapotranspiration (PET) from the Global Land Evaporation Amsterdam Model (GLEAM) and hourly Potential Evapotranspiration (hPET). GLEAM is a set of algorithms designed to calculate actual evaporation, PET, evaporative stress, and root-zone soil moisture.

== Classification ==
SPEI Classification
Value	classification
2.0 or more	Extremely Wet
1.5 to 1.99	Very Wet
1.0 to 1.49	Moderate Wet
-0.99 to 0.99	Normal
-1.0 to -1.49	Moderate Dry
-1.5 to -1.99	Very Dry
-2.0 or less	Extremely Dry

== See also ==
- Keetch–Byram drought index – Estimate of soil moisture deficit
- Palmer drought Index – Regional drought index
