= IPE Management School Paris =

IPE Management School Paris L'Institut pour l'Expertise

About the School
- Type: Private
- President: Jonathan Azoulay
- Registrar: Andrew Mears
- Campuses: 6
- Students: 5500 (2016)
- Location: Paris, France
- Website: www.ipe-paris.com
- Accreditation: CNCP/ACBSP (Educational Member)

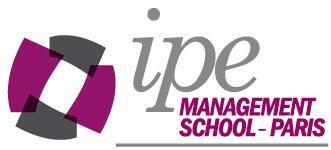

The IPE Management School Paris or the Institut pour l'Expertise is a European business school located in Paris, France. IPE Paris is one of the six grandes écoles within Le Réseau des Grandes Écoles Spécialisées (Réseau GES). Together with other Institutions of Réseau GES, IPE Paris delivers undergraduate and postgraduate level degrees. Réseau GES operates in 6 campus sites in Paris for a student population of over 5,500 students. Their working relationship with over 2,500 French businesses and companies ensures that the programs are relevant to the needs of industry today.

== History ==
IPE Management School, Paris was founded as a major business school and the newest Grande Écoles within the Reseau GES network in France. IPE Paris specialises in the delivery of postgraduate and doctorate-level programs taught entirely in English for the international community. The French grandes écoles are traditionally seen as highly selective and prestigious industry-linked institutions of higher education, alongside public universities in France.

== Programs ==
IPE Paris offers a variety of programs in both French and English. The key objective of the programs is to educate managers with superior skills and capabilities to enable them to make ongoing and lasting contributions to the global economy and their society as a whole.

=== Postgraduate ===
- DBA - Doctor of Business Administration
- MBA - General Management
- MBA - Marketing
- MBA - Finance
- MBA - Tourism Management
- MSc - International Trade and Law
- MSc - Management

=== Undergraduate ===
- BBA - International Business
- BBA - International Trade and Law

== Accreditation and Associations ==
- Fully Accredited by the Malaysian Qualifications Agency (MQA)
- Fully recognised by the French Government at Level 1 (Nivveau 1)
- Registered with the French National Commission for Professional Certification - Commission National de la Certification Professionelle (CNCP)
- Educational Member of the Accreditation Council for Business Schools and Programs (ACBSP)

== Principal officers ==
Principal officers: ==

- President: Jonathan Azoulay
- Registrar: Andrew Mears
- Director Academic Quality Assurance: Allan Sensicle
- Director of Studies Undergraduate Programmes: Jim Corrigan
- Director of Studies – Masters Programmes: Prof. Dr. Mike Moulder
- Director of Studies – DBA: Prof. Dr. Coral Milburn-Curtis

== Research and Faculty ==
The faculty at IPE Paris collaborates extensively with industry partners in France, United Kingdom and Southeast Asia in enabling, promoting, and coordinating the development and application of research in the field of business management. IPE Paris also works with the UK-based International Professional Managers Association to publish the International Professional and Applied Management Review incorporating the International Journal of Professional Management.

== IPE via Videos ==
- IPE Doctor of Business Administration Program at Mantissa College, Malaysia https://www.youtube.com/watch?v=9xiKZWD_ye4

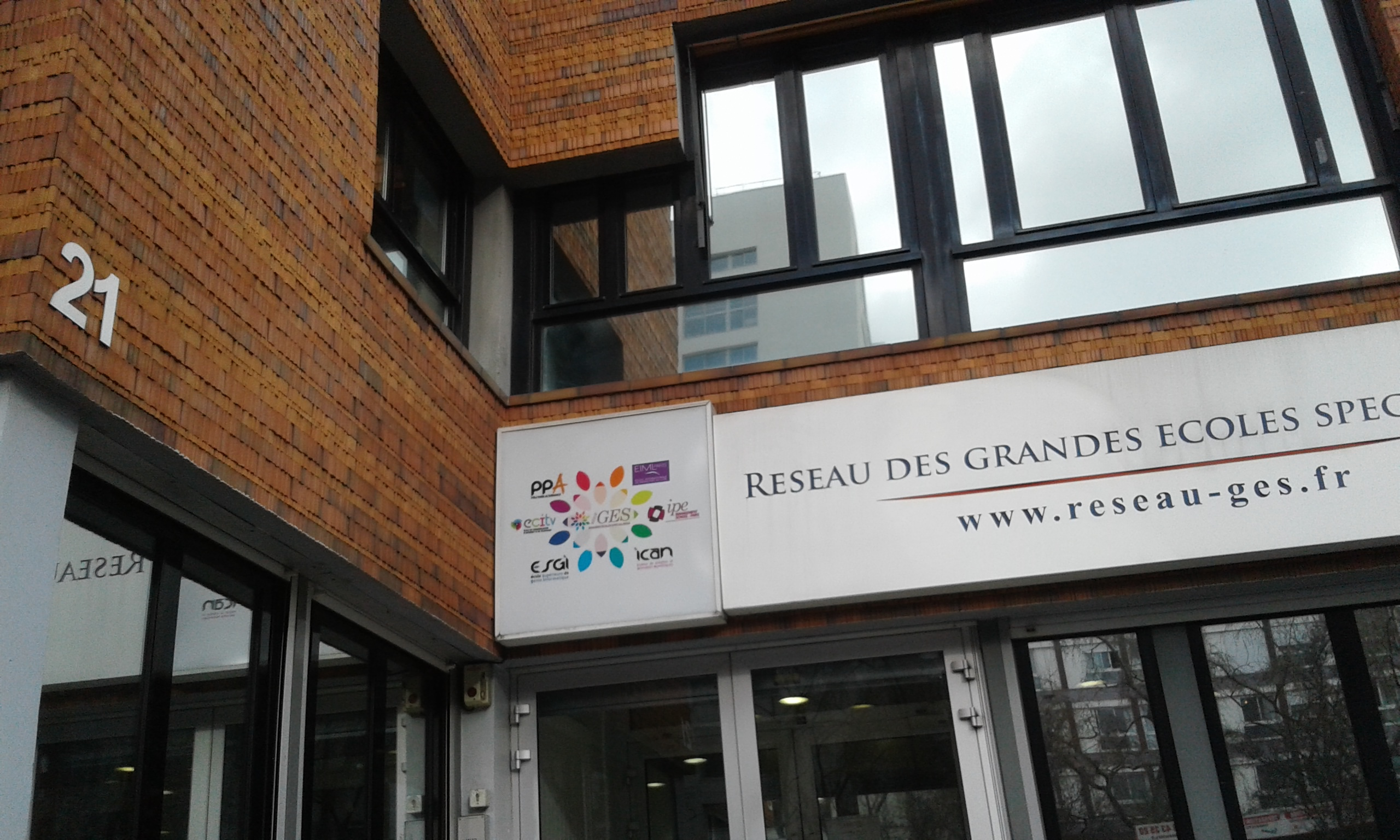
IPE campus
