= Keetch–Byram drought index =

Estimate of soil moisture deficit

The Keetch–Byram drought index (known as KBDI), created by John Keetch and George Byram in 1968 for the United States Department of Agriculture Forest Service, is a measure of drought conditions. It is commonly used for the purpose of predicting the likelihood and severity of wildfires. The measure is calculated based on rainfall, air temperature, and other meteorological factors.

The KBDI is an estimate of the soil moisture deficit, which is the amount of water necessary to bring the soil moisture to its full capacity. A high soil moisture deficit means there is little water available for evaporation or plant transpiration. This occurs in conditions of extended drought, and has significant effects on fire behaviour.

In the United States, this drought index is expressed as a range from 0 to 800, referring to hundredths of an inch of deficit in water availability. In countries that use the metric system, the index is expressed as a range from 0 to 200, referring to millimetres.

Index value (hundredths of inches)	Index value (millimetres)	Implications
0–200	0–50	Soil is moist. 0 represents a completely saturated soil.
200–400	50–100	Leaf litter begins to dry.
400–600	100–150	Lower litter actively contributes to fire intensity and will burn actively.
600–800	150–200	Associated with severe drought and extreme fire behaviour.

== See also ==
- National Fire Danger Rating System
- Palmer drought index
- Standardised Precipitation Evapotranspiration Index
- McArthur Forest Fire Danger Index
- 1988 revision of the paper, "A drought index for forest fire control". http://www.srs.fs.fed.us/pubs/rp/rp_se273.pdf
