= Pyrenean Institute of Ecology =

Spanish public business entity

Pyrenean Ecology Institute
- Instituto Pirenaico de Ecología
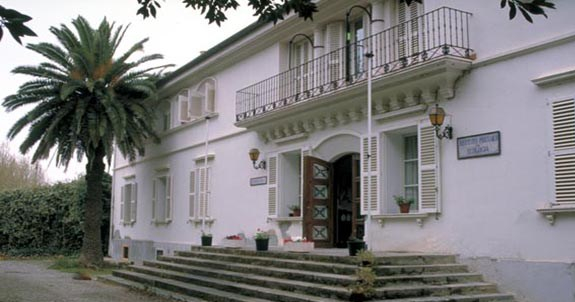
- Abbreviation: IPE
- Formation: 1942
- Locations: Zaragoza, Spain; Jaca, Huesca, Spain
- Parent organization: Consejo Superior de Investigaciones Científicas
- Website: ipe.csic.es

The Pyrenean Ecology Institute, Spanish: Instituto Pirenaico de Ecología, is a Spanish research institute. It was founded in 1942 and is the oldest Aragonese institute in the Spanish National Research Council.

It has two offices, one in Jaca and the other in Zaragoza.

The institute also curates a herbarium of flora from the Aragonese mountains.
