= Drought =

Period with less precipitation than normal

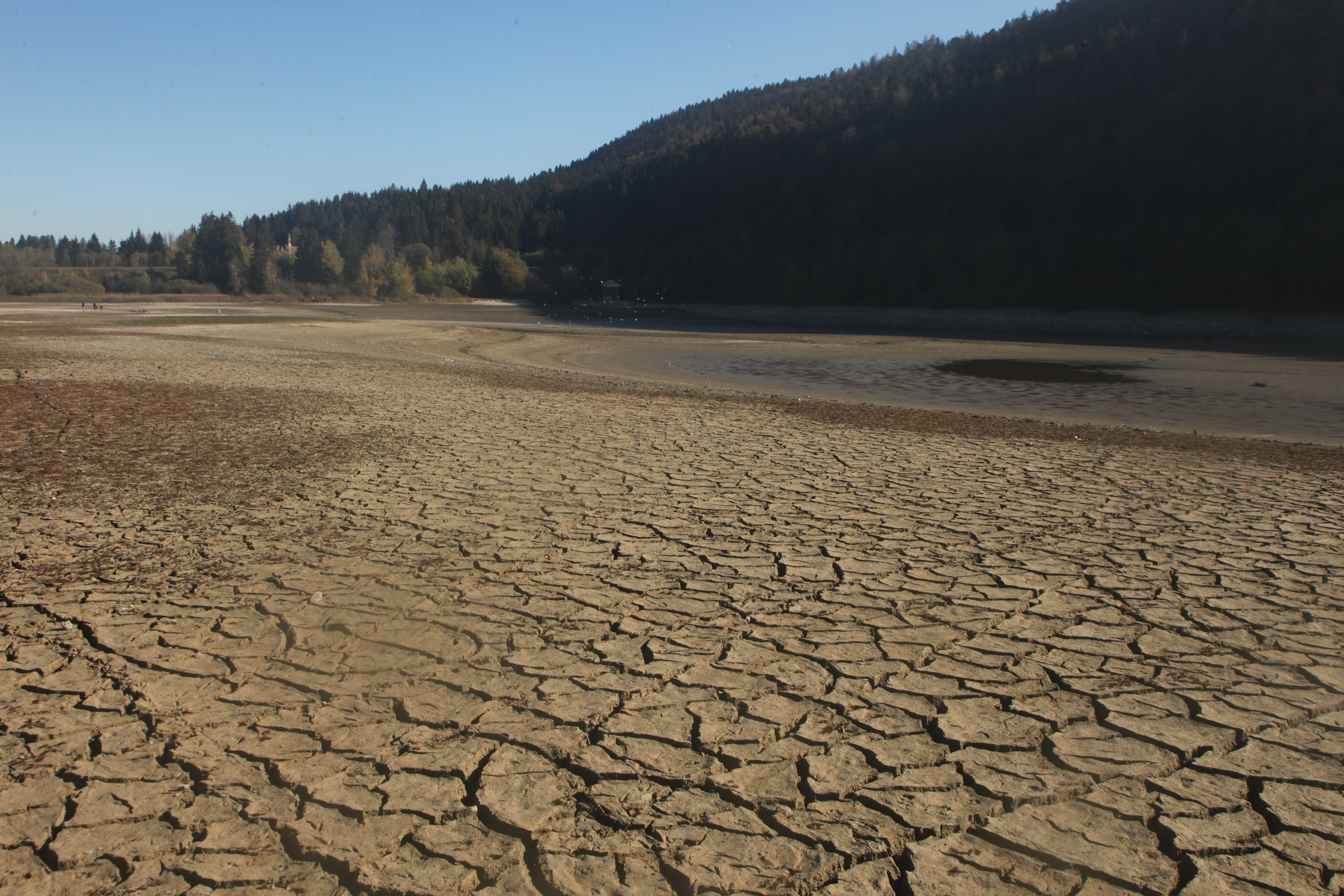
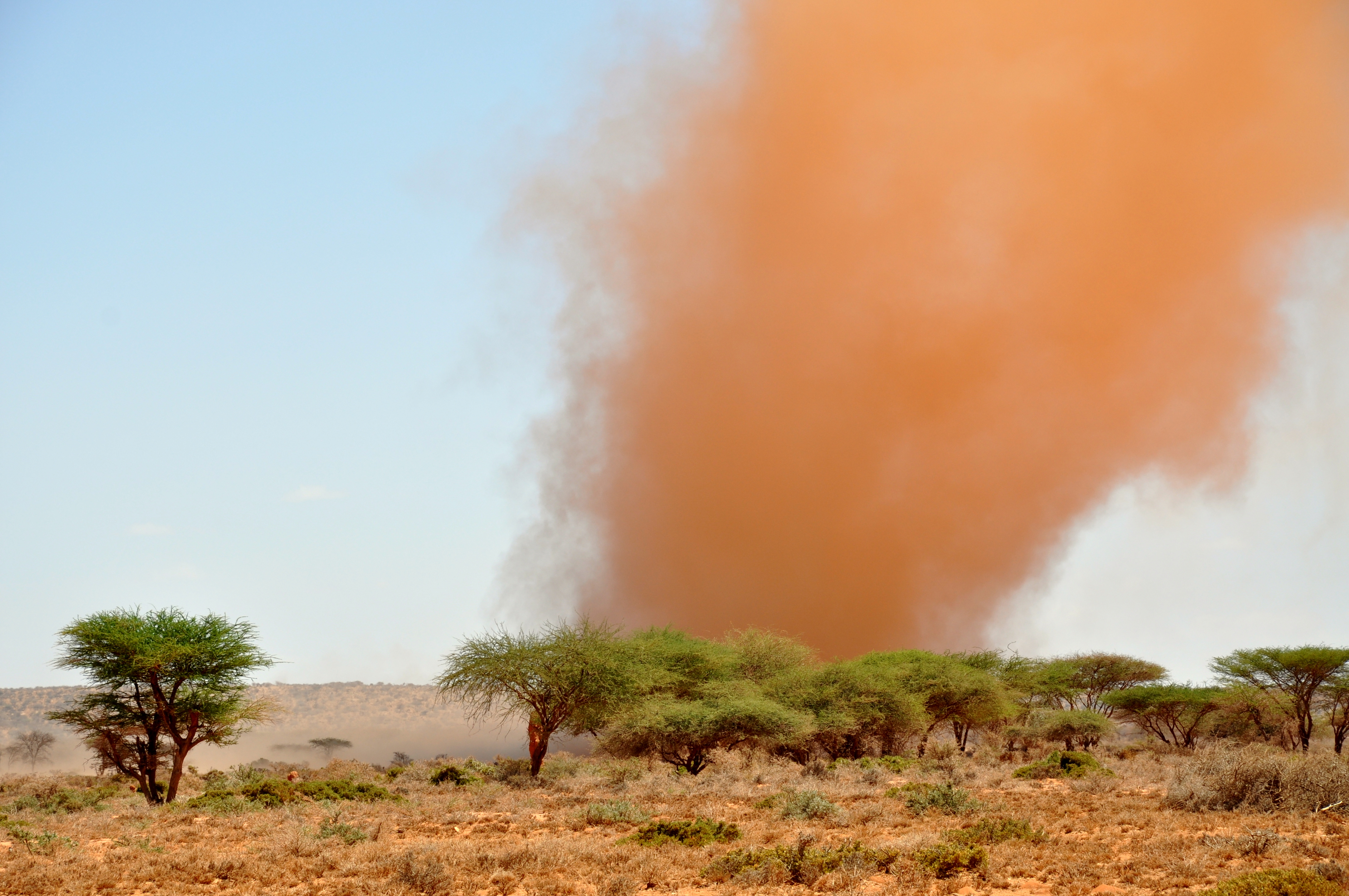
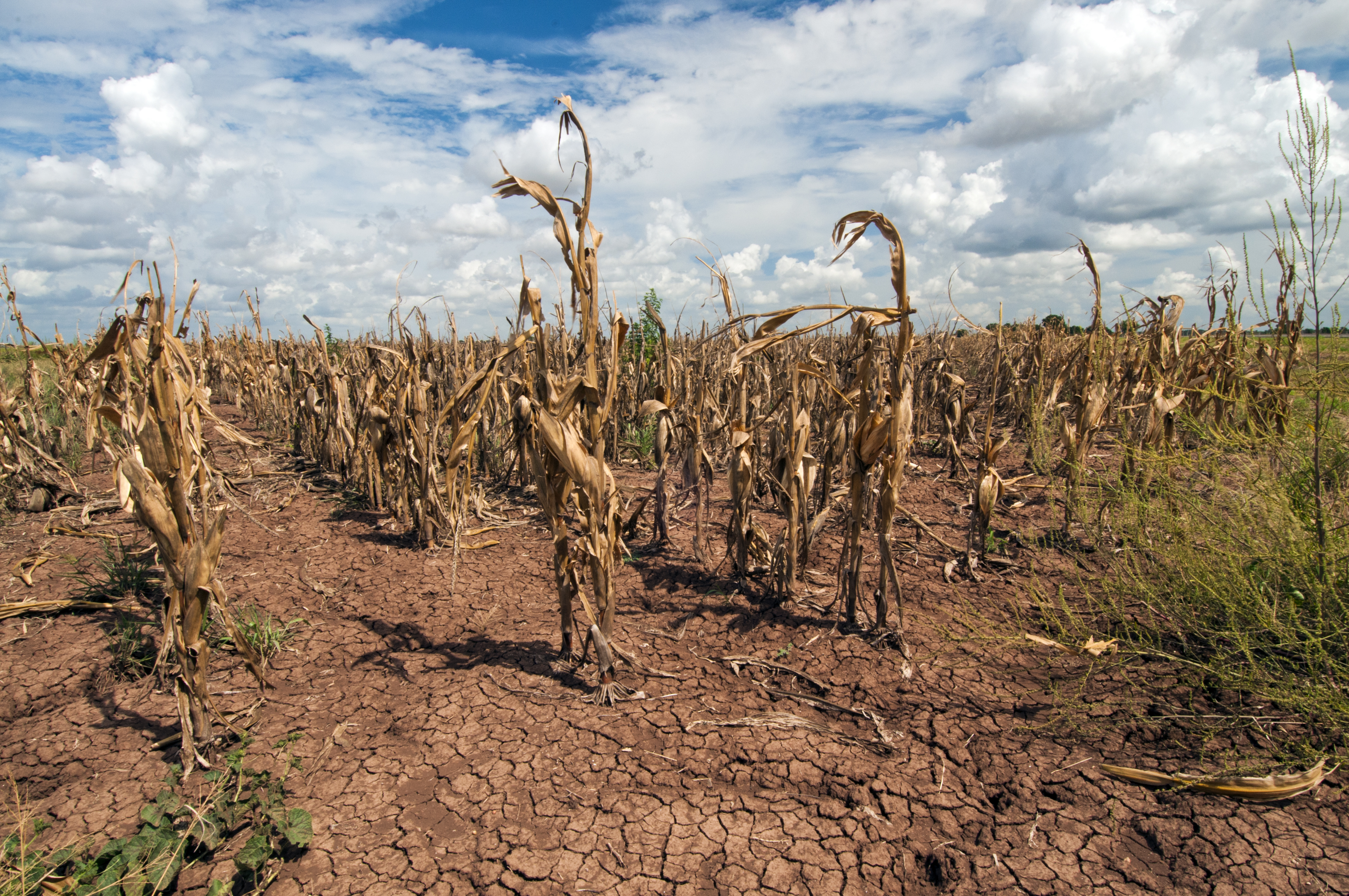
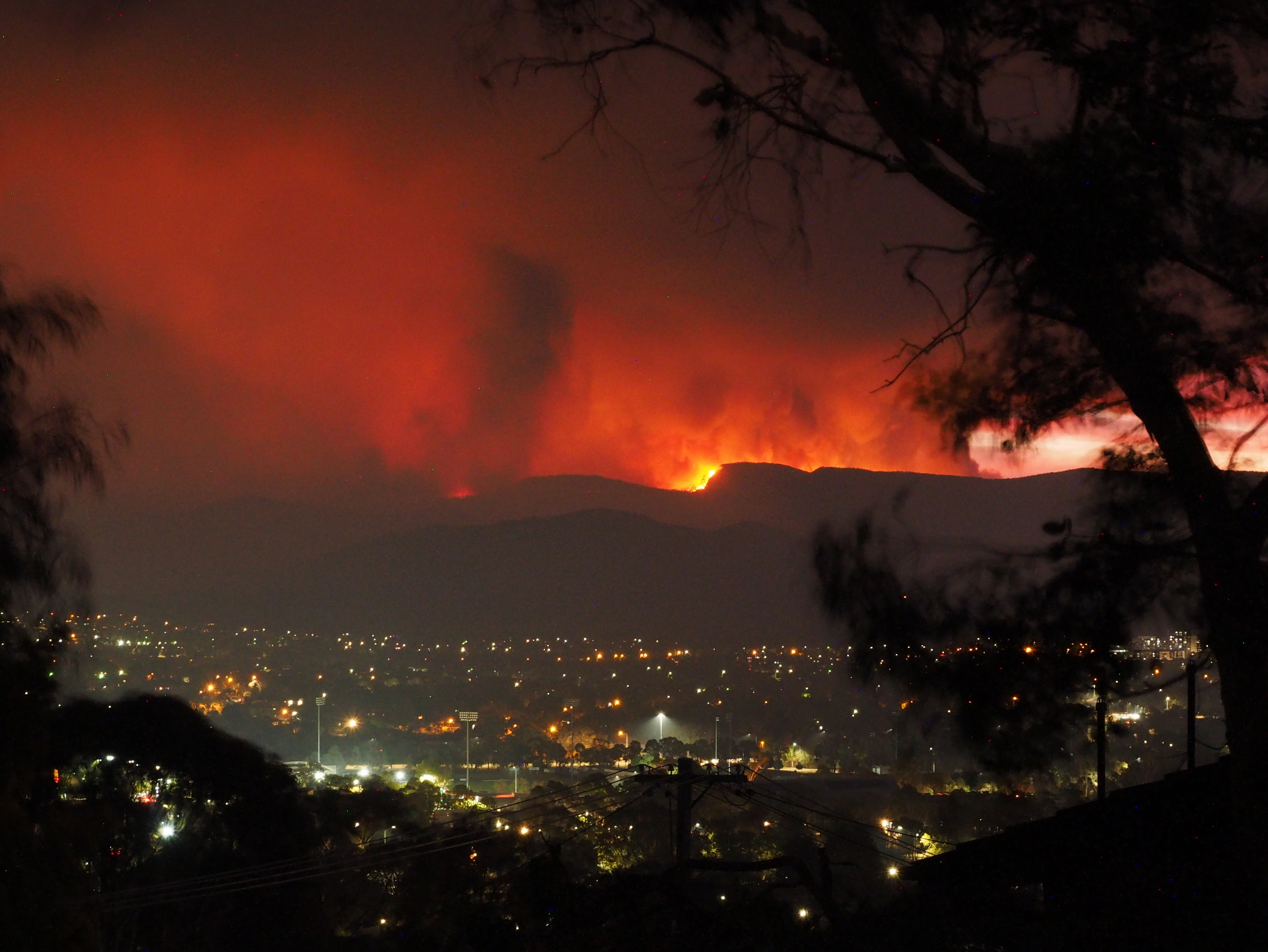
Droughts cause a range of impacts and are often worsened by the effects of climate change on the water cycle: a dry riverbed in France; sandstorm in Somaliland due to drought; droughts negatively impact agriculture in Texas; drought and high temperatures worsened the 2020 bushfires in Australia.

A drought is a period of drier-than-normal conditions. A drought can last for days, months or years. Drought often has large impacts on the ecosystems and agriculture of affected regions, and causes harm to the local economy. Annual dry seasons in the tropics significantly increase the chances of a drought developing, with subsequent increased wildfire risks. Heat waves can significantly worsen drought conditions by increasing evapotranspiration. This dries out forests and other vegetation, and increases the amount of fuel for wildfires.

Drought is a recurring feature of the climate in most parts of the world, becoming more extreme and less predictable due to climate change, which dendrochronological studies date back to 1900. There are three kinds of drought effects, environmental, economic and social. Environmental effects include the drying of wetlands, more and larger wildfires, loss of biodiversity.

Economic impacts of drought result due to negative disruptions to agriculture and livestock farming (causing food insecurity), forestry, public water supplies, river navigation (due to e.g.: lower water levels), electric power supply (by affecting hydropower systems) and impacts on human health.

Social and health costs include the negative effects on the health of people directly exposed to this phenomenon (excessive heat waves), high food costs, stress caused by failed harvests, water scarcity, etc. Drought can also lead to increased air pollution due to increased dust concentrations and wildfires. Prolonged droughts have caused mass migrations and humanitarian crisis.

Examples for regions with increased drought risks are the Amazon basin, Australia, the Sahel region and India. For example, in 2005, parts of the Amazon basin experienced the worst drought in 100 years. Australia could experience more severe droughts and they could become more frequent in the future, a government-commissioned report said on July 6, 2008. The long Australian Millennial drought broke in 2010. The 2020–2022 Horn of Africa drought surpassed the severe drought in 2010–2011 in both duration and severity.

Throughout history, humans have usually viewed droughts as disasters due to the impact on food availability and the rest of society. People have viewed drought as a natural disaster or as something influenced by human activity, or as a result of supernatural forces.

== Definition ==
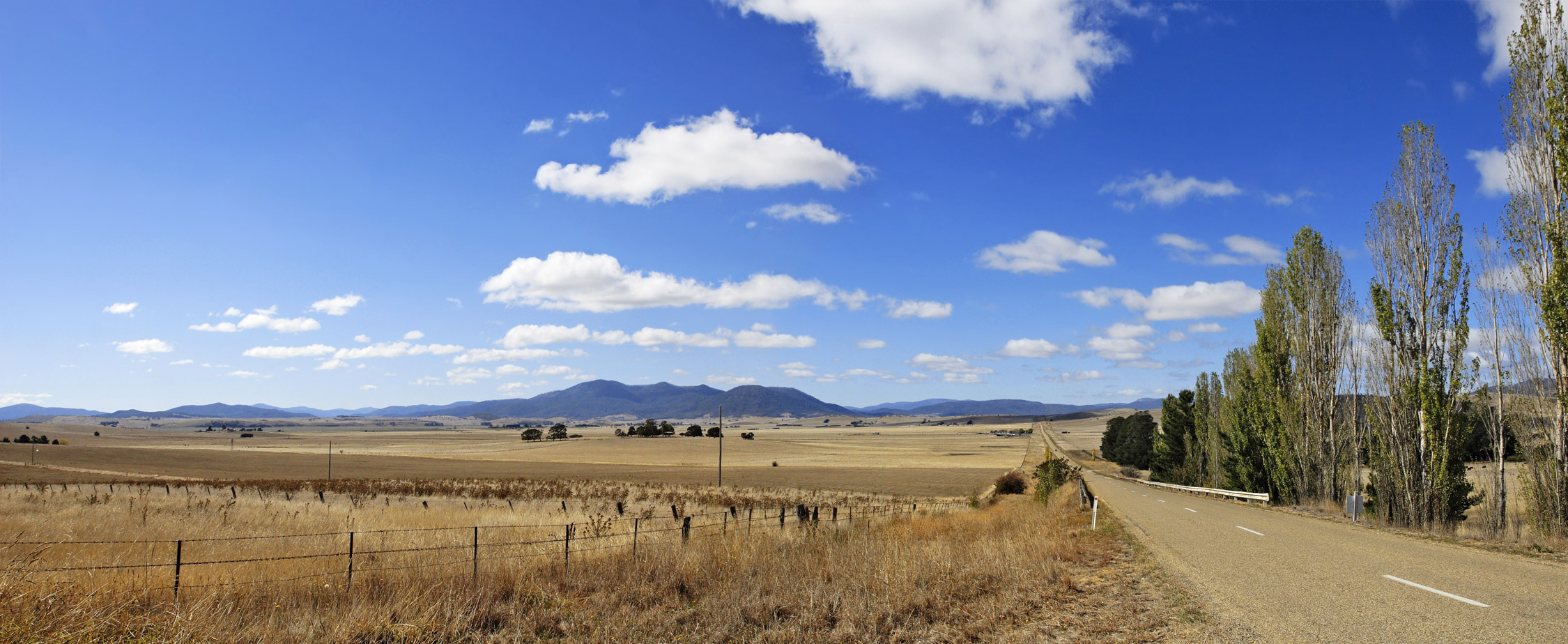
Fields outside Benambra, Australia suffering from drought in 2006.

The IPCC Sixth Assessment Report defines a drought simply as "drier than normal conditions". This means that a drought is "a moisture deficit relative to the average water availability at a given location and season".

According to National Integrated Drought Information System, a multi-agency partnership, drought is generally defined as "a deficiency of precipitation over an extended period of time (usually a season or more), resulting in a water shortage". The National Weather Service office of the NOAA defines drought as "a deficiency of moisture that results in adverse impacts on people, animals, or vegetation over a sizeable area".

Drought is a complex phenomenon − relating to the absence of water − which is difficult to monitor and define. By the early 1980s, over 150 definitions of "drought" had already been published. The range of definitions reflects differences in regions, needs, and disciplinary approaches.

== Categories ==
There are three major categories of drought based on where in the water cycle the moisture deficit occurs: meteorological drought, hydrological drought, and agricultural or ecological drought. A meteorological drought occurs due to lack of precipitation. A hydrological drought is related to low runoff, streamflow, and reservoir and groundwater storage. An agricultural or ecological drought is causing plant stress from a combination of evaporation and low soil moisture. Some organizations add another category: socioeconomic drought occurs when the demand for an economic good exceeds supply as a result of a weather-related shortfall in water supply. The socioeconomic drought is a similar concept to water scarcity.

The different categories of droughts have different causes but similar effects:

1. Meteorological drought occurs when there is a prolonged time with less than average precipitation. Meteorological drought usually precedes the other kinds of drought. As a drought persists, the conditions surrounding it gradually worsen and its impact on the local population gradually increases.
2. Hydrological drought happens when water reserves available in sources such as aquifers, lakes and reservoirs fall below average or a locally significant threshold. Hydrological drought tends to present more slowly because it involves stored water that is used but not replenished. Due to the close interaction with water use, this type of drought can be heavily influenced by water management. Both positive and negative human influences have been discovered and strategic water management strategies seem key to mitigate drought impact. Like agricultural droughts, hydrological droughts can be triggered by more than just a loss of rainfall. For instance, around 2007 Kazakhstan was awarded a large amount of money by the World Bank to restore water that had been diverted to other nations from the Aral Sea under Soviet rule. Similar circumstances also place their largest lake, Balkhash, at risk of completely drying out.
3. Agricultural or ecological droughts affect crop production or ecosystems in general. This condition can also arise independently from any change in precipitation levels when either increased irrigation or soil conditions and erosion triggered by poorly planned agricultural endeavors cause a shortfall in water available to the crops.

== Indices and monitoring ==
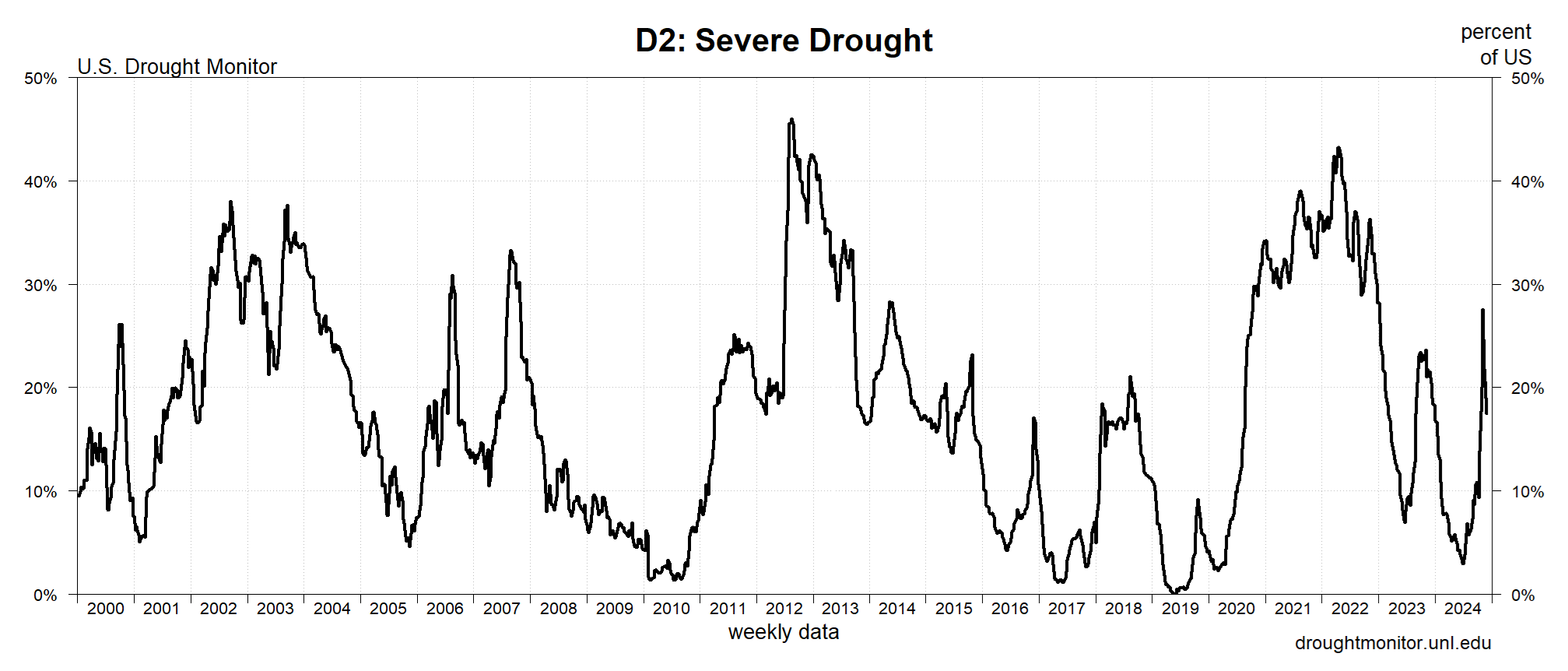
Percent of U.S. experiencing drought intensity of at least level D2 (severe drought), during the weeks of 2000 to 2024.

Several indices have been defined to quantify and monitor drought at different spatial and temporal scales. A key property of drought indices is their spatial comparability, and they must be statistically robust. Drought indices include:

- Palmer drought index (sometimes called the Palmer drought severity index (PDSI)): a regional drought index commonly used for monitoring drought events and studying areal extent and severity of drought episodes. The index uses precipitation and temperature data to study moisture supply and demand using a simple water balance model.
- Keetch-Byram Drought Index: an index that is calculated based on rainfall, air temperature, and other meteorological factors.
- Standardized precipitation index (SPI): It is computed based on precipitation, which makes it a simple and easy-to-apply indicator for monitoring and prediction of droughts in different parts of the world. The World Meteorological Organization recommends this index for identifying and monitoring meteorological droughts in different climates and time periods.
- Standardized Precipitation Evapotranspiration Index (SPEI): a multiscalar drought index based on climatic data. The SPEI accounts also for the role of the increased atmospheric evaporative demand on drought severity. Evaporative demand is particularly dominant during periods of precipitation deficit. The SPEI calculation requires long-term and high-quality precipitation and atmospheric evaporative demand datasets. These can be obtained from ground stations or gridded data based on reanalysis as well as satellite and multi-source datasets.
- Indices related to vegetation: root-zone soil moisture, vegetation condition index (VDI) and vegetation health index (VHI). The VCI and VHI are computed based on vegetation indices such as the normalized difference vegetation index (NDVI) and temperature datasets.
- Deciles index
- Standardized runoff index

High-resolution drought information helps to better assess the spatial and temporal changes and variability in drought duration, severity, and magnitude at a much finer scale. This supports the development of site-specific adaptation measures.

The application of multiple indices using different datasets helps to better manage and monitor droughts than using a single dataset, This is particularly the case in regions of the world where not enough data is available such as Africa and South America. Using a single dataset can be limiting, as it may not capture the full spectrum of drought characteristics and impacts.

Careful monitoring of moisture levels can also help predict increased risk for wildfires.

== Causes ==
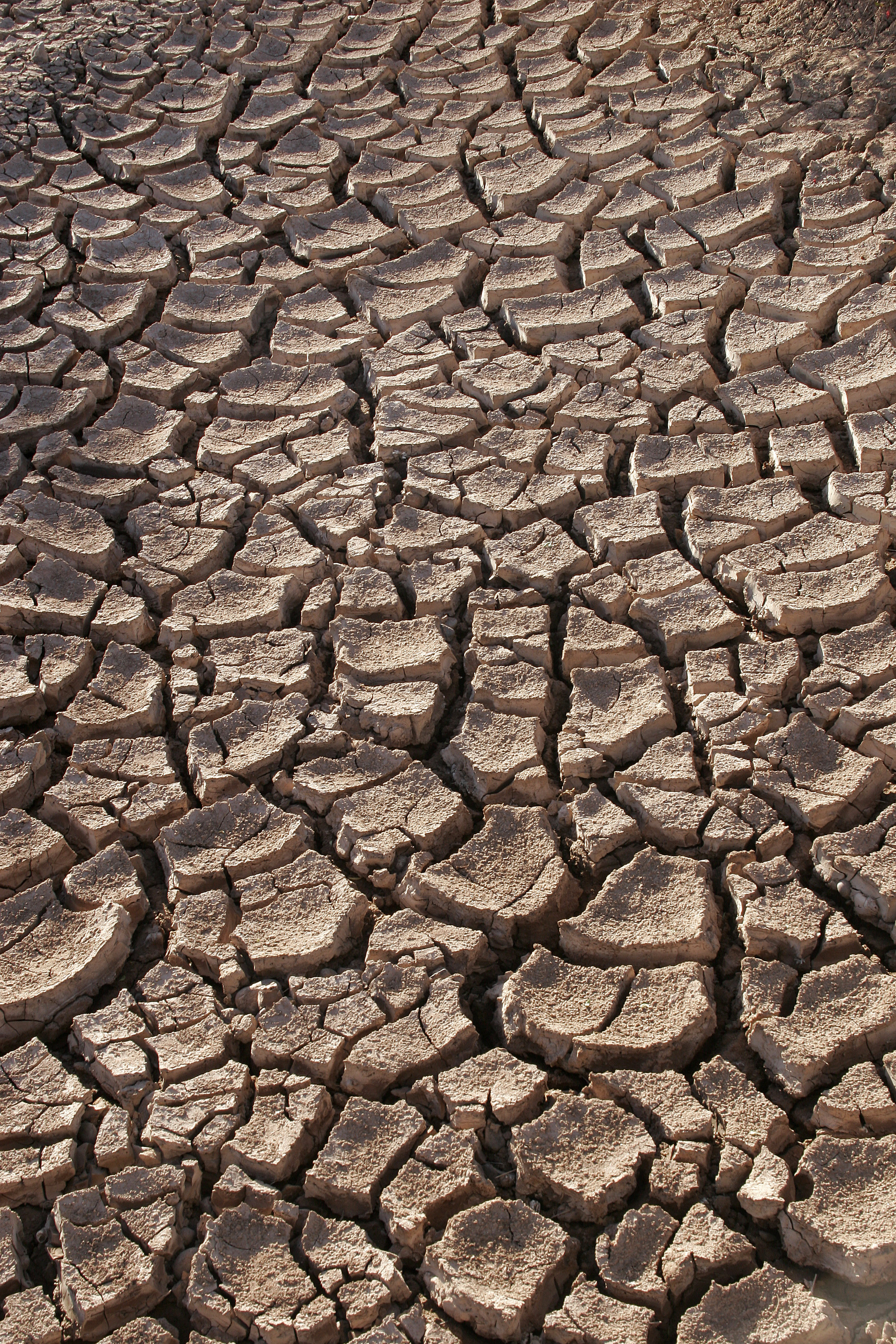
Contraction and desiccation cracks in the dry earth of the Sonoran Desert, northwestern Mexico

=== General precipitation deficiency ===
Mechanisms of producing precipitation include convective, stratiform, and orographic rainfall. Convective processes involve strong vertical motions that can cause the overturning of the atmosphere in that location within an hour and cause heavy precipitation, while stratiform processes involve weaker upward motions and less intense precipitation over a longer duration.

Precipitation can be divided into three categories, based on whether it falls as liquid water, liquid water that freezes on contact with the surface, or ice.

Droughts occur mainly in areas where normal levels of rainfall are, in themselves, low. If these factors do not support precipitation volumes sufficiently to reach the surface over a sufficient time, the result is drought. Drought can be triggered by a high level of reflected sunlight and above average prevalence of high pressure systems, winds carrying continental, rather than oceanic air masses, and ridges of high pressure areas aloft can prevent or restrict the developing of thunderstorm activity or rainfall over one certain region. Once a region is within drought, feedback mechanisms such as local arid air, hot conditions which can promote warm core ridging, and minimal evapotranspiration can worsen drought conditions.

==== Dry season ====
Within the tropics, distinct, wet and dry seasons emerge due to the movement of the Intertropical Convergence Zone or Monsoon trough. The dry season greatly increases drought occurrence, and is characterized by its low humidity, with watering holes and rivers drying up. Because of the lack of these watering holes, many grazing animals are forced to migrate due to the lack of water in search of more fertile lands. Examples of such animals are zebras, elephants, and wildebeest. Because of the lack of water in the plants, bushfires are common. Since water vapor becomes more energetic with increasing temperature, more water vapor is required to increase relative humidity values to 100% at higher temperatures (or to get the temperature to fall to the dew point). Periods of warmth quicken the pace of fruit and vegetable production, increase evaporation and transpiration from plants, and worsen drought conditions.

==== El Niño–Southern Oscillation (ENSO) ====
The El Niño–Southern Oscillation (ENSO) phenomenon can sometimes play a significant role in drought. ENSO comprises two patterns of temperature anomalies in the central Pacific Ocean, known as La Niña and El Niño. La Niña events are generally associated with drier and hotter conditions and further exacerbation of drought in California and the Southwestern United States, and to some extent the U.S. Southeast. Meteorological scientists have observed that La Niñas have become more frequent over time.

Conversely, during El Niño events, drier and hotter weather occurs in parts of the Amazon River Basin, Colombia, and Central America. Winters during the El Niño are warmer and drier than average conditions in the Northwest, northern Midwest, and northern Mideast United States, so those regions experience reduced snowfalls. Conditions are also drier than normal from December to February in south-central Africa, mainly in Zambia, Zimbabwe, Mozambique, and Botswana. Direct effects of El Niño resulting in drier conditions occur in parts of Southeast Asia and Northern Australia, increasing bush fires, worsening haze, and decreasing air quality dramatically. Drier-than-normal conditions are also in general observed in Queensland, inland Victoria, inland New South Wales, and eastern Tasmania from June to August. As warm water spreads from the west Pacific and the Indian Ocean to the east Pacific, it causes extensive drought in the western Pacific. Singapore experienced the driest February in 2014 since records began in 1869, with only 6.3 mm of rain falling in the month and temperatures hitting as high as 35 °C on 26 February. The years 1968 and 2005 had the next driest Februaries, when 8.4 mm of rain fell.

=== Climate change ===
There will likely be multiplicative increases in the frequency of extreme weather events compared to the pre-industrial era for heat waves, droughts and heavy precipitation events, for various climate change scenarios.

Globally, the occurrence of droughts has increased as a result of the increase in temperature and atmospheric evaporative demand. In addition, increased climate variability has increased the frequency and severity of drought events. Moreover, the occurrence and impact of droughts are aggravated by anthropogenic activities such as land use change and water management and demand.

The IPCC Sixth Assessment Report also pointed out that "Warming over land drives an increase in atmospheric evaporative demand and in the severity of drought events" and "Increased atmospheric evaporative demand increases plant water stress, leading to agricultural and ecological drought".

There is a rise of compound warm-season droughts in Europe that are concurrent with an increase in potential evapotranspiration.

In Southwestern North American megadrought starting about the year 2000, the water level of Lake Powell declined from near maximum capacity to within 30 feet (9.1 m) of the minimum level needed for Glen Canyon Dam to generate electricity.

Climate change affects many factors associated with droughts. These include how much rain falls and how fast the rain evaporates again. Warming over land increases the severity and frequency of droughts around much of the world. In some tropical and subtropical regions of the world, there will probably be less rain due to global warming. This will make them more prone to drought. Droughts are set to worsen in many regions of the world. These include Central America, the Amazon and south-western South America. They also include West and Southern Africa. The Mediterranean and south-western Australia are also some of these regions.

Higher temperatures increase evaporation. This dries the soil and increases plant stress. Agriculture suffers as a result. This means even regions where overall rainfall is expected to remain relatively stable will experience these impacts. These regions include central and northern Europe. Without climate change mitigation, around one third of land areas are likely to experience moderate or more severe drought by 2100. Due to global warming droughts are more frequent and intense than in the past.

Several social factors may worsen the impact of droughts. These are increased water demand, population growth and urban expansion in many areas. Land restoration techniques, such as agroforestry, can help reduce the impact of droughts.

=== Vegetation changes, erosion and human activities ===
Human activity can directly trigger exacerbating factors such as over-farming, excessive irrigation, deforestation, and erosion adversely impact the ability of the land to capture and hold water. In arid climates, the main source of erosion is wind. Erosion can be the result of material movement by the wind. The wind can cause small particles to be lifted and therefore moved to another region (deflation). Suspended particles within the wind may impact on solid objects causing erosion by abrasion (ecological succession). Wind erosion generally occurs in areas with little or no vegetation, often in areas where there is insufficient rainfall to support vegetation. Woody plant encroachment can increase soil porosity and therewith the chances of soil drought.

== Impacts ==
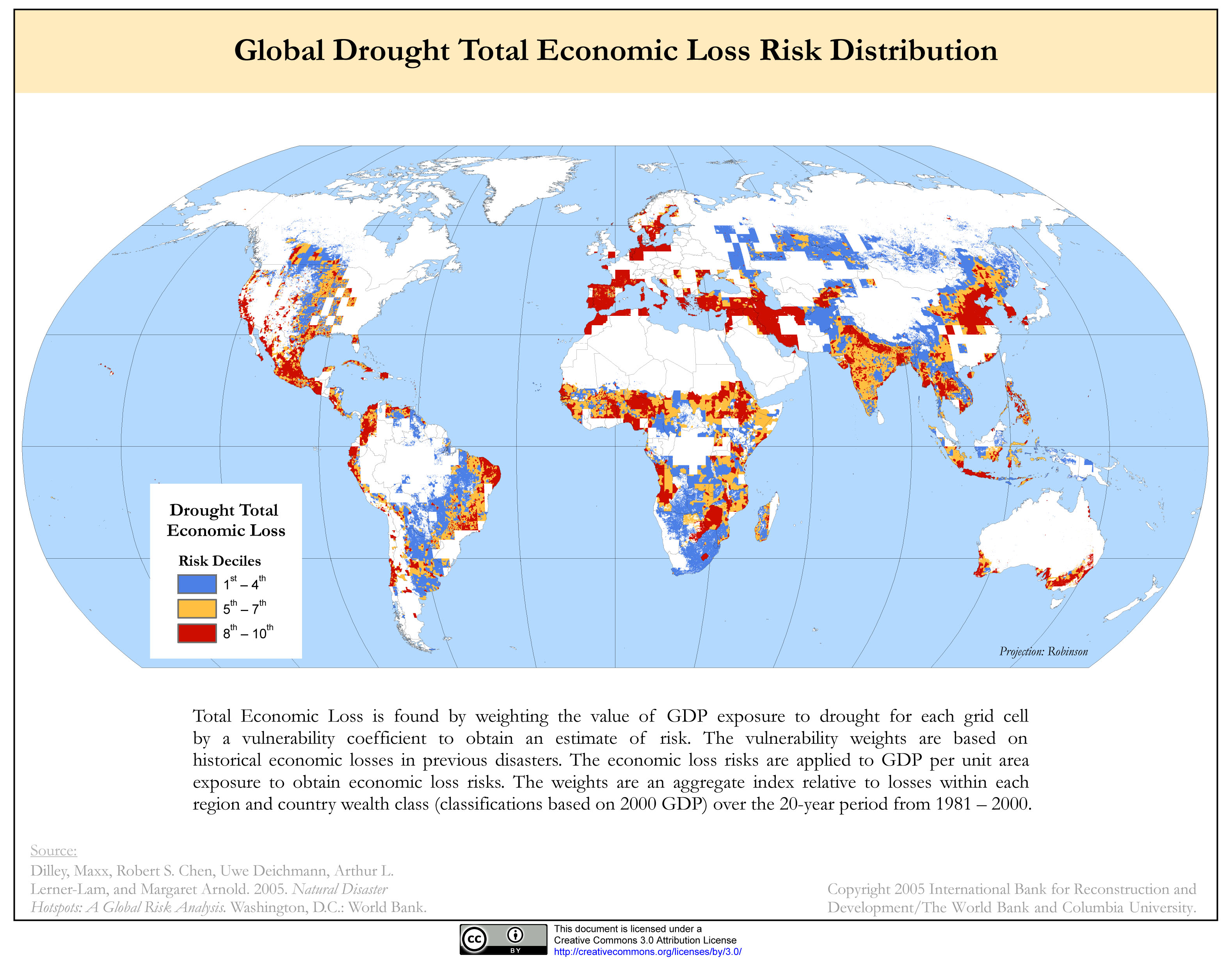
Global drought total economic loss risk

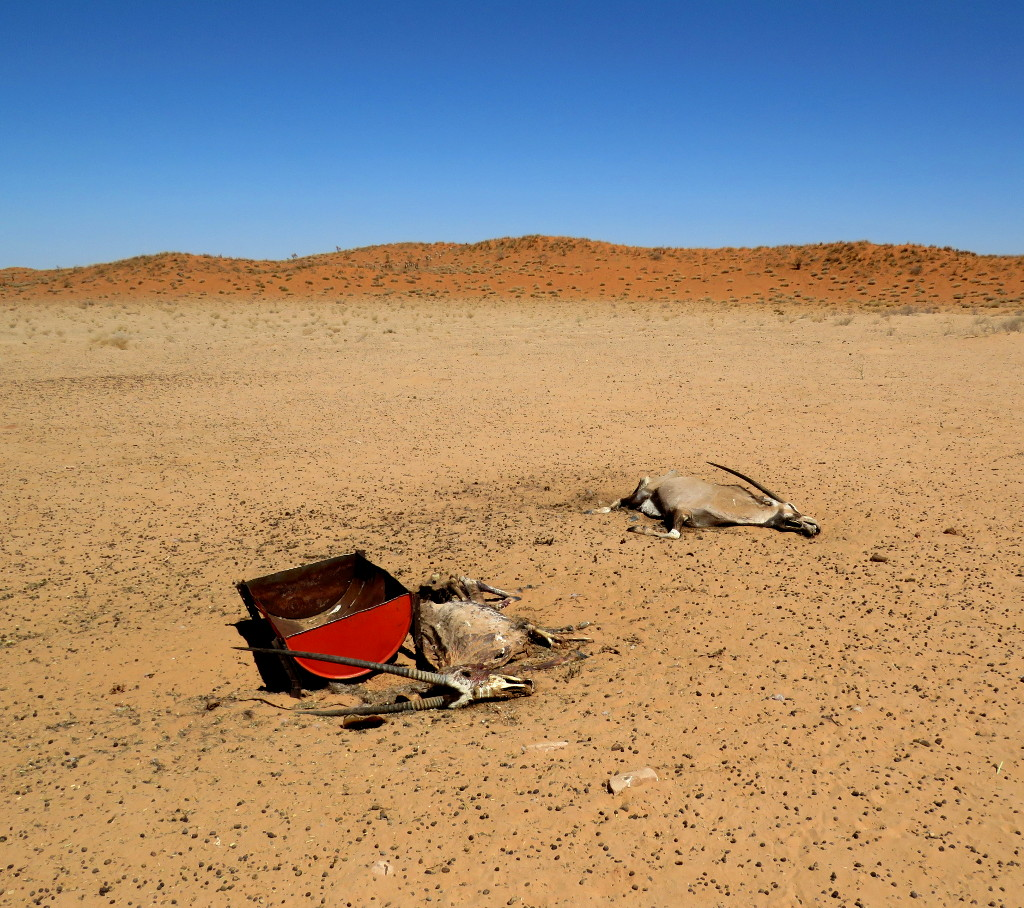
Pair of dead oryx in Namibia during the 2018–19 Southern Africa drought.

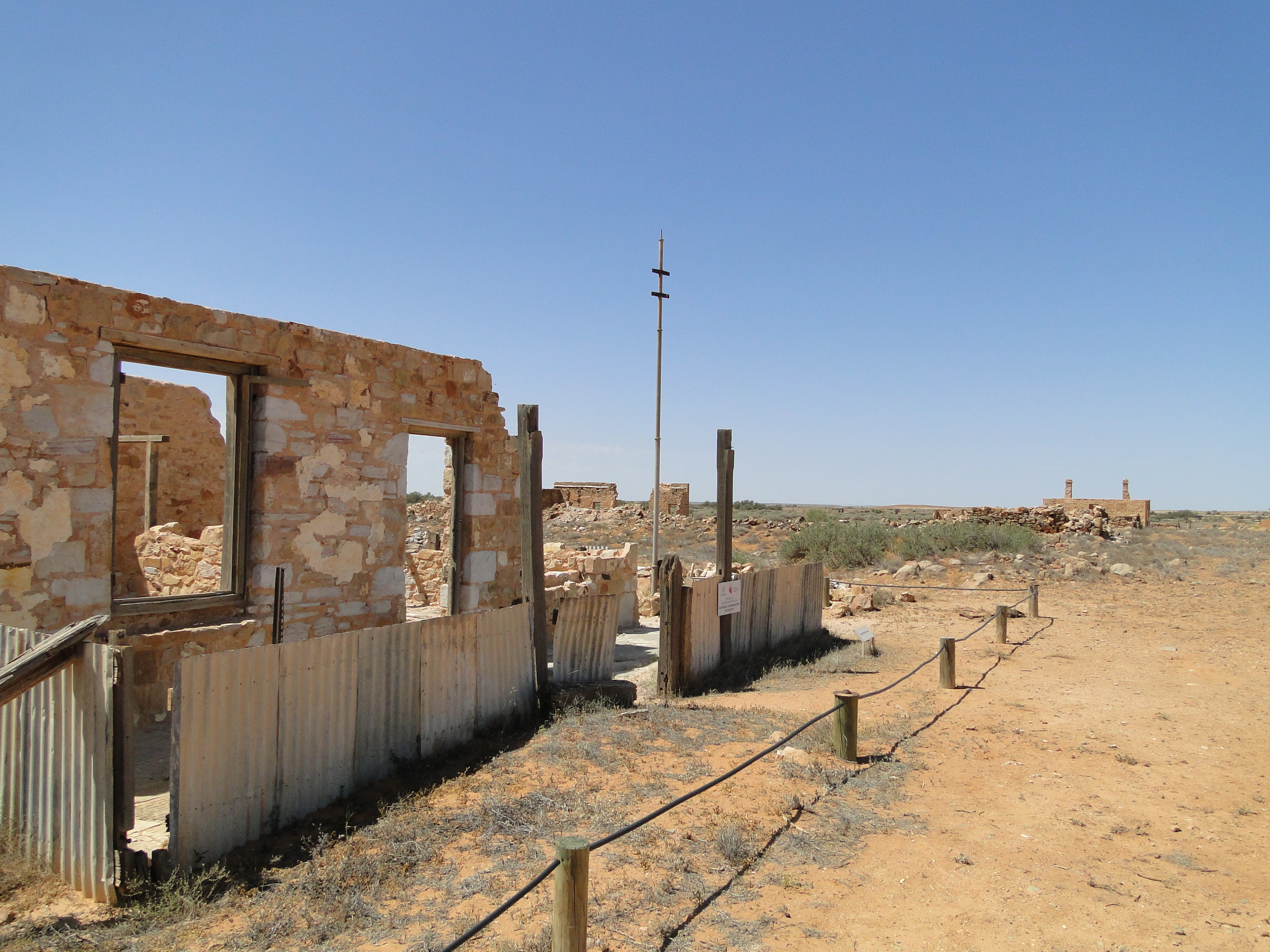
After years of drought and dust storms the town of Farina in South Australia was abandoned.

Drought is one of the most complex and major natural hazards, and it has devastating impacts on the environment, economy, water resources, agriculture, and society worldwide.

One can divide the impacts of droughts and water shortages into three groups: environmental, economic and social (including health).

=== Environmental and economic impacts ===
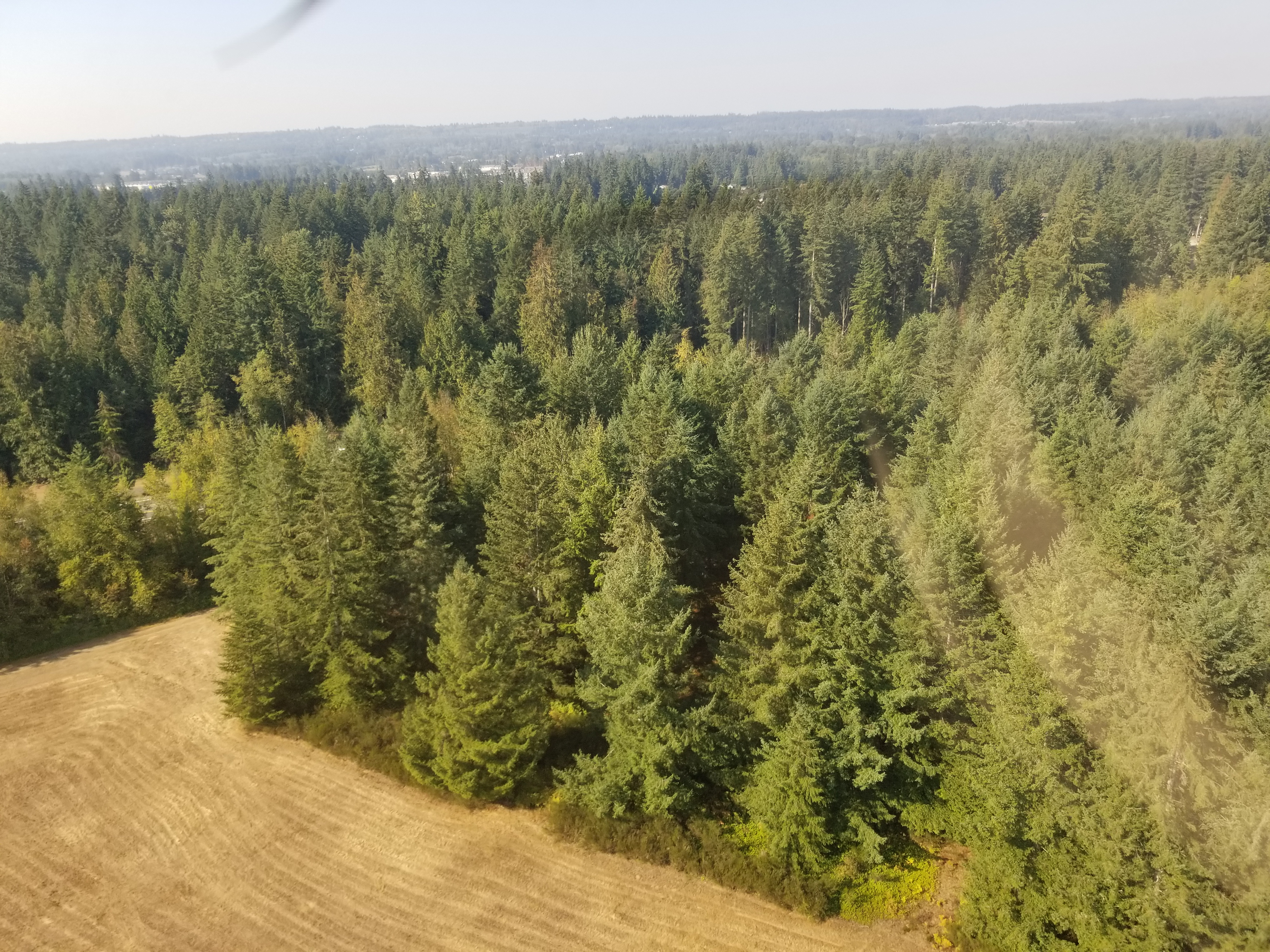
Western red cedar dying from drought, US, 2018

Environmental effects of droughts include: lower surface and subterranean water-levels, lower flow-levels (with a decrease below the minimum leading to direct danger for amphibian life), increased pollution of surface water, the drying out of wetlands, more and larger wildfires, higher deflation intensity, loss of biodiversity, worse health of trees and the appearance of pests and dendroid diseases. Drought-induced mortality of trees lacks in most climate models in their representation of forests as land carbon sink.

Economic losses as a result of droughts include lower agricultural, forests, game and fishing output, higher food-production costs, lower energy-production levels in hydro plants, losses caused by depleted water tourism and transport revenue, problems with water supply for the energy sector and for technological processes in metallurgy, mining, the chemical, paper, wood, foodstuff industries etc., disruption of water supplies for municipal economies. It has been calculated by the Food and Agriculture Organization of the United Nations that droughts had caused US$278 billion of damage between 1991 and 2023.

Further examples of common environmental and economic consequences of drought include:

- Alteration of diversity of plant communities, which can have an impact on net primary production and other ecosystem services.
- Wildfires, such as Australian bushfires and wildfires in the United States, become more common during times of drought and may cause human deaths.
- Dust Bowls, themselves a sign of erosion, which further erode the landscape
- Dust storms, when drought hits an area suffering from desertification and erosion
- Habitat damage, affecting both terrestrial and aquatic wildlife
- Snake migration, which results in snake-bites
- Reduced electricity production due to reduced water-flow through hydroelectric dams
- Shortages of water for industrial users

=== Agricultural impacts ===
Impacts of climate change on soil moisture at 2 °C of global warming. A reduction of one standard deviation means that average soil moisture will approximate the ninth driest year between 1850 and 1900.

Economic loss in agriculture and non-agricultural sectors caused by drought compared to other hazard types.

Droughts can cause land degradation and loss of soil moisture, resulting in the destruction of cropland productivity. This can result in diminished crop growth or yield productions and carrying capacity for livestock. Drought in combination with high levels of grazing pressure can function as the tipping point for an ecosystem, causing woody encroachment.

Water stress affects plant development and quality in a variety of ways: firstly drought can cause poor germination and impaired seedling development. At the same time plant growth relies on cellular division, cell enlargement, and differentiation. Drought stress impairs mitosis and cell elongation via loss of turgor pressure which results in poor growth. Development of leaves is also dependent upon turgor pressure, concentration of nutrients, and carbon assimilates all of which are reduced by drought conditions, thus drought stress lead to a decrease in leaf size and number. Plant height, biomass, leaf size and stem girth has been shown to decrease in maize under water limiting conditions. Crop yield is also negatively effected by drought stress, the reduction in crop yield results from a decrease in photosynthetic rate, changes in leaf development, and altered allocation of resources all due to drought stress. Crop plants exposed to drought stress suffer from reductions in leaf water potential and transpiration rate. Water-use efficiency increases in crops such as wheat while decreasing in others, such as potatoes.

Plants need water for the uptake of nutrients from the soil, and for the transport of nutrients throughout the plant: drought conditions limit these functions leading to stunted growth. Drought stress also causes a decrease in photosynthetic activity in plants due to the reduction of photosynthetic tissues, stomatal closure, and reduced performance of photosynthetic machinery. This reduction in photosynthetic activity contributes to the reduction in plant growth and yields. Another factor influencing reduced plant growth and yields include the allocation of resources; following drought stress plants will allocate more resources to roots to aid in water uptake increasing root growth and reducing the growth of other plant parts while decreasing yields.

=== Social and health impacts ===
The most negative impacts of drought for humans include crop failure, food crisis, famine, malnutrition, and poverty, which lead to loss of life and mass migration of people.

There are negative effects on the health of people who are directly exposed to this phenomenon (excessive heat waves). Droughts can also cause limitations of water supplies, increased water pollution levels, high food-costs, stress caused by failed harvests, water scarcity, etc. Reduced water quality can occur because lower water-flows reduce dilution of pollutants and increase contamination of remaining water sources.

This explains why droughts and water scarcity operate as a factor which increases the gap between developed and developing countries.

Effects vary according to vulnerability. For example, subsistence farmers are more likely to migrate during drought because they do not have alternative food-sources. Areas with populations that depend on water sources as a major food-source are more vulnerable to famine.

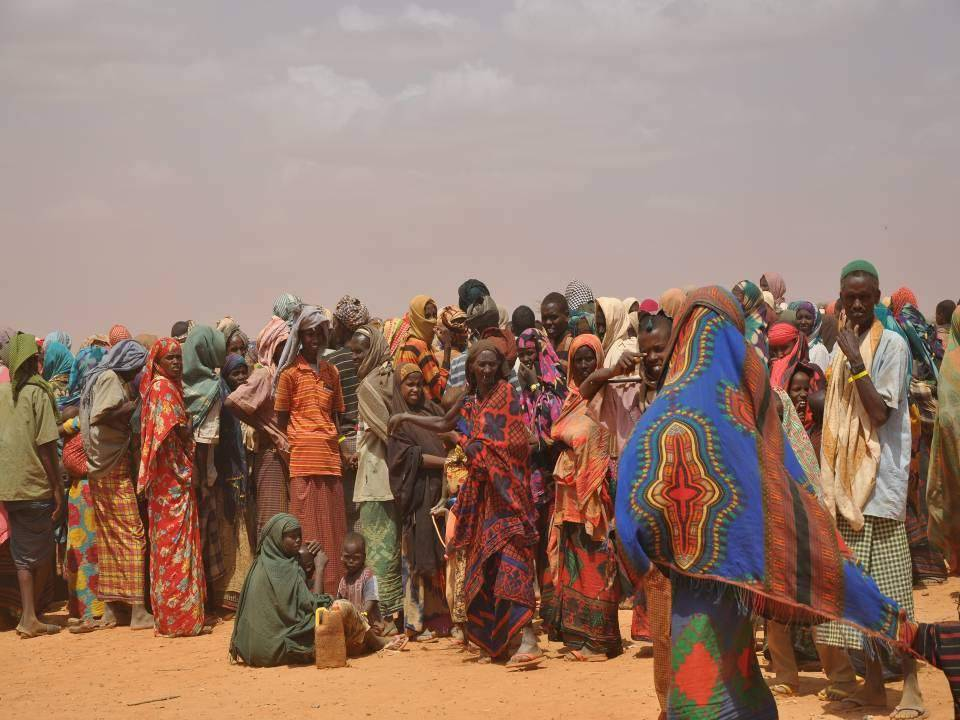
People displaced by a drought in Somalia arriving at a camp in Dolo Ado, Ethiopia, 2011

Further examples of social and health consequences include:

- Water scarcity, crop failure, famine and hunger – drought provides too little water to support food crops; malnutrition, dehydration and related diseases
- Mass migration, resulting in internal displacement and international refugees
- Social unrest
- War over natural resources, including water and food
- Cyanotoxin accumulation within food chains and water supply (some of which are among the most potent toxins known to science) can cause cancer with low exposure over the long term. High levels of microcystin appeared in San Francisco Bay Area salt-water shellfish and fresh-water supplies throughout the state of California in 2016.

Severe drought has been noted to cause unrest and precede in some cases periods of political upheaval.

=== Loss of fertile soils ===
Wind erosion is much more severe in arid areas and during times of drought. For example, in the Great Plains, it is estimated that soil loss due to wind erosion can be as much as 6100 times greater in drought years than in wet years.

Loess is a homogeneous, typically nonstratified, porous, friable, slightly coherent, often calcareous, fine-grained, silty, pale yellow or buff, windblown (Aeolian) sediment. It generally occurs as a widespread blanket deposit that covers areas of hundreds of square kilometers and tens of meters thick. Loess often stands in either steep or vertical faces. Loess tends to develop into highly rich soils. Under appropriate climatic conditions, areas with loess are among the most agriculturally productive in the world. Loess deposits are geologically unstable by nature, and will erode very readily. Therefore, windbreaks (such as big trees and bushes) are often planted by farmers to reduce the wind erosion of loess.

== Regions particularly affected ==
=== Amazon basin ===
In 2005, parts of the Amazon basin experienced the worst drought in 100 years. A 2006 article reported results showing that the forest in its present form could survive only three years of drought. Scientists at the Brazilian National Institute of Amazonian Research argue in the article that this drought response, coupled with the effects of deforestation on regional climate, are pushing the rainforest towards a "tipping point" where it would irreversibly start to die. It concludes that the rainforest is on the brink of being turned into savanna or desert, with catastrophic consequences for the world's climate. According to the WWF, the combination of climate change and deforestation increases the drying effect of dead trees that fuels forest fires.

=== Australia ===
The 1997–2009 Millennium Drought in Australia led to a water supply crisis across much of the country. As a result, many desalination plants were built for the first time (see list).

By far the largest part of Australia is desert or semi-arid lands commonly known as the outback. A 2005 study by Australian and American researchers investigated the desertification of the interior, and suggested that one explanation was related to human settlers who arrived about 50,000 years ago. Regular burning by these settlers could have prevented monsoons from reaching interior Australia. In June 2008 it became known that an expert panel had warned of long term, maybe irreversible, severe ecological damage for the whole Murray-Darling basin if it did not receive sufficient water by October 2008. Australia could experience more severe droughts and they could become more frequent in the future, a government-commissioned report said on July 6, 2008. Australian environmentalist Tim Flannery, predicted that unless it made drastic changes, Perth in Western Australia could become the world's first ghost metropolis, an abandoned city with no more water to sustain its population. The long Australian Millennial drought broke in 2010.

=== East Africa ===
East Africa, including for example Ethiopia, Eritrea, Kenya, Somalia, South Sudan, Sudan, Tanzania, and Uganda, has a diverse climate, ranging from hot, dry regions to cooler, wetter highland regions. The region has considerable variability in seasonal rainfall and a very complex topography. In the northern parts of the region within the Nile basin (Ethiopia, Sudan), the rainfall is characterized by an unimodal cycle with a wet season from July to September. The rest of the region has a bimodal annual cycle, featuring long rains from March to May and the short rains from October to December. The frequent occurrence of hydrological extremes, like droughts and floods, harms the already vulnerable population suffering from severe poverty and economic turmoil. Droughts prompted food shortages for example in 1984–85, 2006 and 2011.

The Eastern African region experiences the impacts of climate change in different forms. For instance, below-average rainfall occurred for six consecutive rainy seasons in the Horn of Africa during the period 2020–2023 leading to the third longest and most widespread drought on record with dire implications for food security (see Horn of Africa drought (2020–present)). Conversely, other parts experienced extreme floods, e.g., the 2020 East Africa floods in Ethiopia, Rwanda, Kenya, Burundi, and Uganda, and the 2022 floods in South Sudan.

A key feature in the region is the heterogeneous distribution of hydrologic extremes in space and time. For instance, El Niño can cause droughts in one part of the region and floods in the other. This is also a common situation within a country, e.g., in Ethiopia. The recent years with consecutive droughts followed by floods are a testament to the need to better forecast these kinds of events and their impacts.

=== Himalayan river basins ===
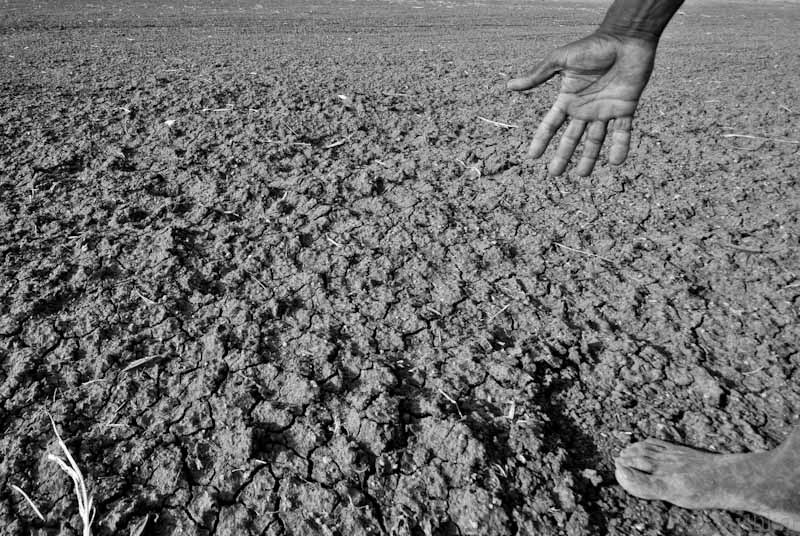
Drought-affected area in Karnataka, India in 2012.

Approximately 2.4 billion people live in the drainage basin of the Himalayan rivers. India, China, Pakistan, Bangladesh, Nepal and Myanmar could experience floods followed by droughts in coming decades. Drought in India affecting the Ganges is of particular concern, as it provides drinking water and agricultural irrigation for more than 500 million people. In 2025, the UN warned that retreating glaciers could threaten the food and water supply of 2 billion people worldwide.

=== North America ===
The west coast of North America, which gets much of its water from glaciers in mountain ranges such as the Rocky Mountains and Sierra Nevada, also would be affected.

== By country or region ==
Droughts in particular countries:

See also:

- Droughts and famines in Russia and USSR
- Droughts in California
- Droughts in the Sahel
- 2021 Madagascar food crisis
- 2010 China drought and dust storms
- Cape Town water crisis from 2015 to 2018

== Protection, mitigation and relief ==
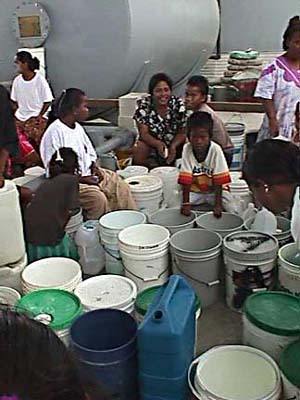
Water distribution on Marshall Islands during El Niño.

Agriculturally, people can effectively mitigate much of the impact of drought through irrigation and crop rotation. Failure to develop adequate drought mitigation strategies carries a grave human cost in the modern era, exacerbated by ever-increasing population densities.

Strategies for drought protection or mitigation include:

- Dams – many dams and their associated reservoirs supply additional water in times of drought.
- Cloud seeding – a form of intentional weather modification to induce rainfall. This remains a hotly debated topic, as the United States National Research Council released a report in 2004 stating that to date, there is still no convincing scientific proof of the efficacy of intentional weather modification.
- Land use – Carefully planned crop rotation can help to minimize erosion and allow farmers to plant less water-dependent crops in drier years.
- Transvasement – Building canals or redirecting rivers as massive attempts at irrigation in drought-prone areas.

When water is scarce due to droughts, there are a range of options for people to access other sources of water, such as wastewater reuse, rainwater harvesting and stormwater recovery, or seawater desalination.

== History ==
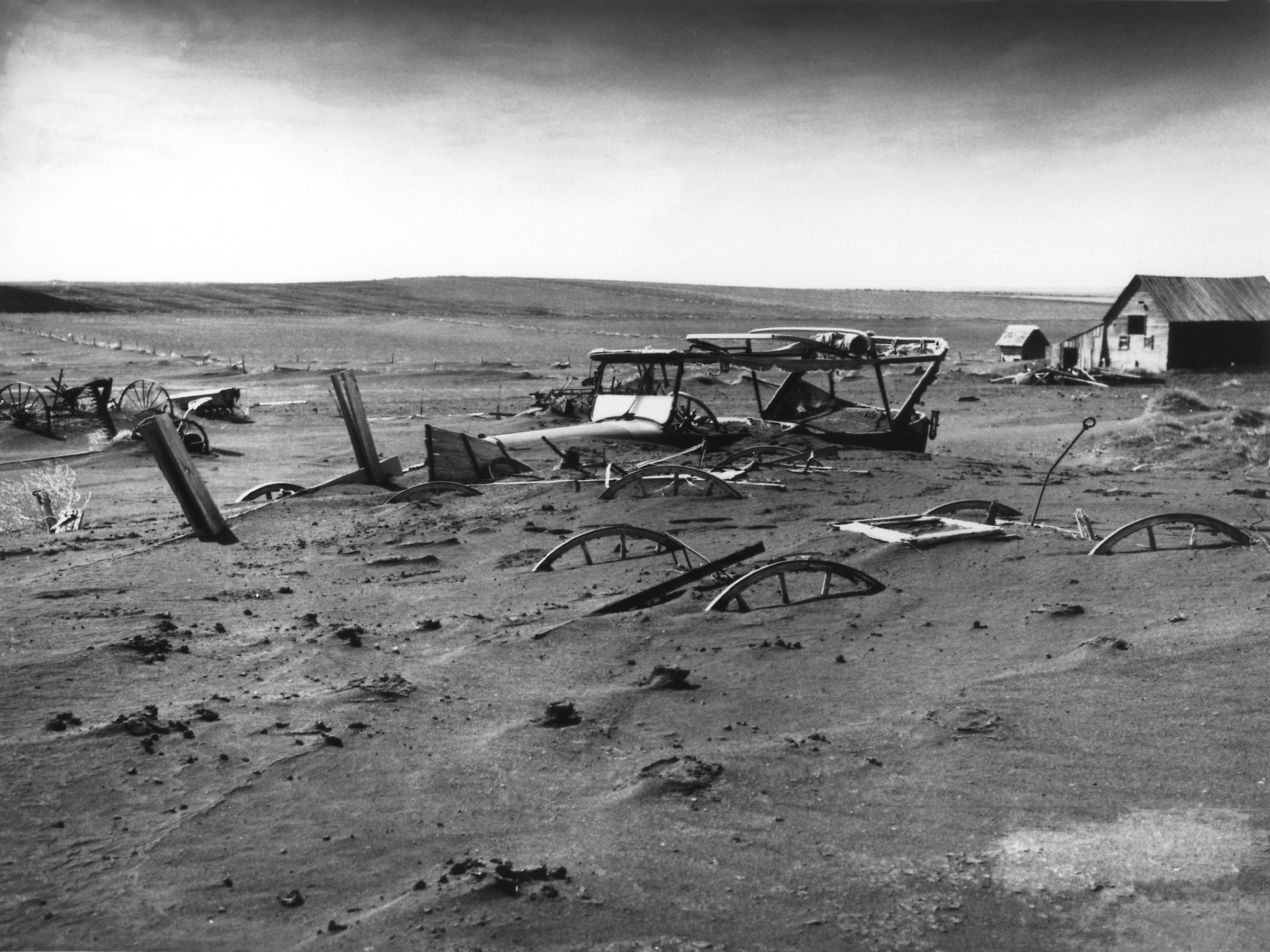
A South Dakota farm during the Dust Bowl, 1936

Throughout history, humans have usually viewed droughts as disasters due to the impact on food availability and the rest of society. Drought is among the earliest documented climatic events, present in the Epic of Gilgamesh and tied to the Biblical story of Joseph's arrival in and the later Exodus from ancient Egypt. Hunter-gatherer migrations in 9,500 BC Chile have been linked to the phenomenon, as has the exodus of early humans out of Africa and into the rest of the world around 135,000 years ago.

Droughts can be scientifically explained in terms of physical mechanisms, which underlie natural disasters and are influenced by human impact on the environment. Beliefs about drought are further shaped by cultural factors including local knowledge, perceptions, values, beliefs and religion. In some places and times, droughts have been interpreted as the work of supernatural forces. Globally, people in many societies have been more likely to explain natural events like drought, famine and disease in terms of the supernatural than they are to explain social phenomena like war, murder, and theft. The links between droughts and events in the past, such as conflicts or political collapse, remain challenging to determine due to complex rhetorical and textual strategies used in historical descriptions of such events or their consequences.

Historically, rituals have been used in an attempt to prevent or avert drought. Rainmaking rituals have ranged from dances to scapegoating to human sacrifices. Many ancient practices are now a matter of folklore while others may still be practiced.

In areas where people have limited understanding of the scientific basis of drought, beliefs about drought continue to reflect indigenous beliefs in the power of spirits and Christian philosophies that see drought as a divine punishment. Such beliefs can influence people's thinking and affect their resilience and ability to adapt to stress and respond to crises. In the case of Creationism, curricula sometimes give religious explanations of natural phenomena rather than scientific ones. Teaching explicitly denies evolution, that human agency is affecting climate, and that climate change is occurring.

Some historical droughts include:

- The 4.2-kiloyear event, a megadrought that took place in Africa and Asia between 5,000 and 4,000 years ago, has been linked with the collapse of the Old Kingdom in Egypt, the Akkadian Empire in Mesopotamia, the Liangzhu culture in the lower Yangtze River area, and the Indus Valley Civilization.
- The longest drought in recorded history started 400 years ago in the Atacama Desert in Chile and still continues.
- Drought might have been a contributing factor to Classic Maya collapse between the 7th and 9th centuries.
- 1540 Central Europe, said to be the "worst drought of the millennium" with eleven months without rain and temperatures of 5–7 °C above the average of the 20th century
- 1900 India killing between 250,000 and 3.25 million.
- 1921–22 Soviet Union in which over 5 million perished from starvation due to the combined effects of severe drought and war.
- 1928–1930 Northwest China resulting in over 3 million deaths by famine.

== See also ==
- Aridity index
- Drought refuge
- Flash drought
- Food security
- Leaf Sensor
- List of droughts
- List of famines
- Permanent wilting point
- United Nations Convention to Combat Desertification
- Water security
