= Palmer drought index =

Regional drought index

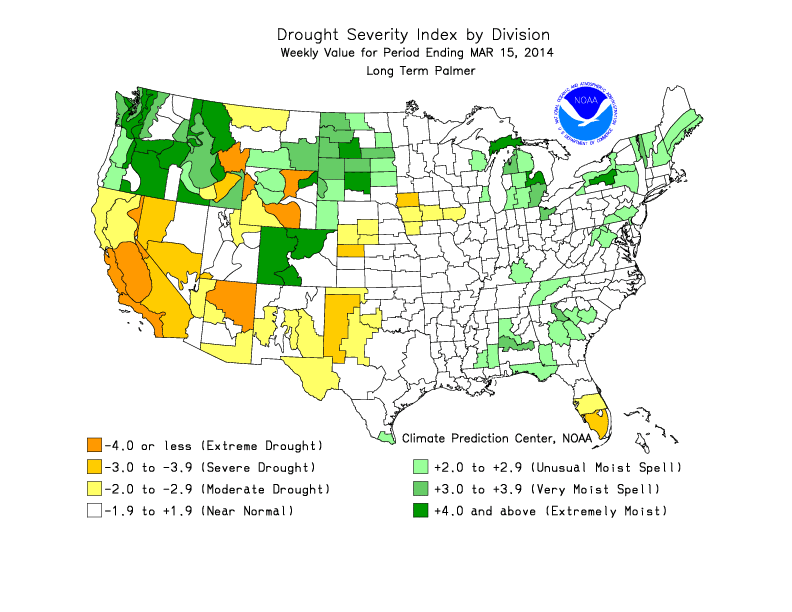

The Palmer drought index, sometimes called the Palmer drought severity index (PDSI), or the Palmer Z index or simply the Palmer index, is a regional drought index commonly used for monitoring drought events and studying areal extent and severity of drought episodes. The index uses precipitation and temperature data to study moisture supply and demand using a simple water balance model. It was developed by meteorologist Wayne Palmer, who first published his method in the 1965 paper Meteorological Drought for the Office of Climatology of the U.S. Weather Bureau.

The Palmer Drought Index is based on a supply-and-demand model of soil moisture. Supply is comparatively straightforward to calculate, but demand is more complicated as it depends on many factors, not just temperature and the amount of moisture in the soil but also hard-to-calibrate factors including evapotranspiration and recharge rates. Palmer tried to overcome these difficulties by developing an algorithm that approximated them based on the most readily available data, precipitation and temperature.

The index has proven most effective in determining long-term drought, a matter of several months, but it is not as good with conditions over a matter of weeks. It uses a 0 as normal, and drought is shown in terms of negative numbers; for example, negative 2 is moderate drought, negative 3 is severe drought, and negative 4 or less is extreme drought. Palmer's algorithm also is used to describe wet spells, using corresponding positive numbers; for example, 2 is unusually moist, 3 is very moist, and 4 or more is extremely moist. Palmer also developed a formula for standardizing drought calculations for each individual location based on the variability of precipitation and temperature at that location. The Palmer index can therefore be applied to any site for which sufficient precipitation and temperature data is available.

Critics have argued that the utility of the Palmer index is weakened by the arbitrary nature of Palmer's algorithms, including the technique used for standardization and arbitrary designation of drought severity classes and internal temporal memory. The Palmer index's inability to account for snow and frozen ground also is cited as a weakness.

The Palmer index is widely used operationally, with Palmer maps published weekly by the United States Government's National Oceanic and Atmospheric Administration. It also has been used by climatologists to standardize global long-term drought analysis. Global Palmer data sets have been developed based on instrumental records beginning in the 19th century. In addition, dendrochronology has been used to generate estimated Palmer index values for North America for the past 2000 years, allowing analysis of long term drought trends. It has also been used as a means of explaining the Late Bronze Age collapse.

In the US, regional Palmer maps are featured on the cable channel Weatherscan.

== PDSI classification ==
The PDSI is a standardized index that ranges from -10 to +10, with negative values indicating drought conditions and positive values indicating wet conditions.

Classification of the PDSI
PDSI value	classification
4.0 or more	extremely wet
3.0 to 3.99	very wet
2.0 to 2.99	moderate wet
1.0 to 1.99	slightly wet
0.5 to 0.99	incipient wet spell
0.49 to -0.49	near normal
-0.5 to -0.99	incipient dry spell
-1.0 to -1.99	mild drought
-2.0 to -2.99	moderate drought
-3.0 to -3.99	severe drought
-4.0 or less	extreme drought

== See also ==
- Keetch–Byram drought index – Estimate of soil moisture deficit
- Standardised Precipitation Evapotranspiration Index – Multiscalar drought index based on climatic data
- United States Drought Monitor – Collection of measures that allows experts to assess droughts in the US
- Drought – Period with less precipitation than normal
