= 1998 United States Senate election in Arkansas =

- November 3, 1998

Nominee	Blanche Lincoln	Fay Boozman
Party	Democratic	Republican
Popular vote	385,878	295,870
Percentage	55.07%	42.23%
- County results Lincoln: 40–50% 50–60% 60–70% 70–80% 80–90% Boozman: 40–50% 50–60% 60–70%
U.S. senator before election
Dale Bumpers
Democratic
Elected U.S. Senator
Blanche Lincoln
Democratic

The 1998 United States Senate election in Arkansas was held on November 3, 1998. Democratic incumbent Dale Bumpers retired instead of seeking reelection to a fifth term. Democratic former U.S. Representative Blanche Lincoln won the open seat against Republican state senator Fay Boozman. At 38, Lincoln was the youngest woman ever elected to the United States Senate and the first woman elected to the Senate from Arkansas since Hattie Carraway in 1938.

In 2010, Lincoln lost re-election to a third term by Fay Boozman's brother, John Boozman.

== Democratic primary ==
=== Candidates ===
- Winston Bryant, attorney general of Arkansas and 1996 Senate nominee
- Nate Coulter, 1993 nominee for lieutenant governor
- Blanche Lincoln, former U.S. representative from Helena
- Scott Ferguson, state representative

==== Withdrew ====
- Pat Hays, mayor of North Little Rock

=== Results ===
Primary results by county: Lincoln: 30–40%; 40–50%; 50–60%; 60–70%; 70–80%; Bryant: 20–30%; 30–40%; 40–50%; 50–60%; Ferguson: 30–40%; 50–60%

Democratic primary results
Party	Candidate	Votes	%
Democratic	Blanche Lincoln	145,009	45.5%
Democratic	Winston Bryant	87,183	27.4%
Democratic	Scott Ferguson	44,761	14.0%
Democratic	Nate Coulter	41,848	13.1%
Total votes		318,801	100.00%

== Republican primary ==
=== Candidates ===
- Fay Boozman, state senator from Fort Smith
- Tom Prince, mayor of Little Rock

=== Results ===
Republican primary results
Party	Candidate	Votes	%
Republican	Fay Boozman	128,929	78.0%
Republican	Tom Prince	44,006	22.0%
Total votes		172,035	100.00%

== General election ==
=== Candidates ===
- Blanche Lincoln, former U.S. representative from Helena (Democratic)
- Fay Boozman, state senator from Fort Smith (Republican)
- Charley Heffley (Reform)

=== Background ===
During the campaign, Boozman caused controversy for his comments about rape, claiming that women rarely became pregnant after being raped due to a hormone he described as "God's little protective shield".

=== Polling ===
Poll source	Date(s) administered	Sample size (Note: Key: A – all adults RV – registered voters LV – likely voters V – unclear)	Margin of error	Blanche Lincoln (D)	Fay Boozman (R)	Charley Heffley (Rf)	Undecided
Mason-Dixon Polling & Strategy	October 23–25, 1998	810 (LV)	± 3.5%	56%	36%	–	8%
Mason-Dixon Polling & Strategy	October 5–7, 1998	838 (LV)	± 3.5%	52%	39%	–	9%
Mason-Dixon Polling & Strategy	September 8–9, 1998	811 (LV)	± 3.5%	52%	36%	1%	11%
Mason-Dixon Polling & Strategy	June 1–3, 1998	805 (LV)	± 3.5%	51%	33%	1%	15%

=== Results ===
Arkansas Senate election 1998
Party	Candidate	Votes	%
Democratic	Blanche Lincoln	385,878	55.07%
Republican	Fay Boozman	295,870	42.23%
Reform	Charley E. Heffley	18,896	2.70%
Democratic hold			

== See also ==
- 1998 United States Senate elections
- 2002 United States Senate election in Arkansas
- 2008 United States Senate election in Arkansas
