= Blanche Lincoln =

American politician (born 1960)

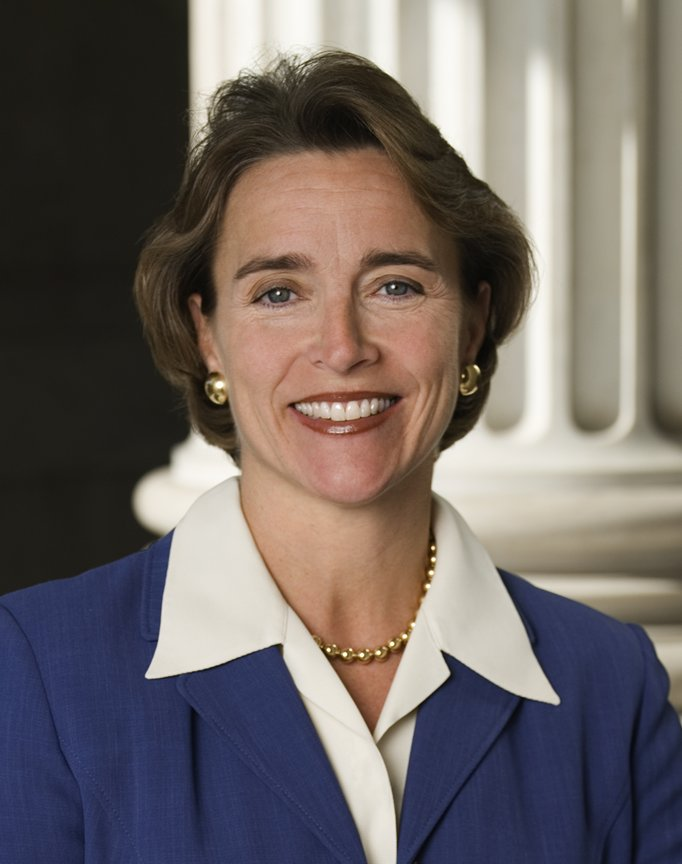
- Official portrait, 2007

Chair of the Senate Agriculture Committee
- In office September 9, 2009 – January 3, 2011
- Preceded by: Tom Harkin
- Succeeded by: Debbie Stabenow

United States Senator from Arkansas
- In office January 3, 1999 – January 3, 2011
- Preceded by: Dale Bumpers
- Succeeded by: John Boozman

Member of the U.S. House of Representatives from Arkansas's 1st district
- In office January 3, 1993 – January 3, 1997
- Preceded by: William Alexander
- Succeeded by: Marion Berry

Personal details
- Born: Blanche Meyers Lambert; September 30, 1960 (age 66) Helena, Arkansas, U.S.
- Party: Democratic
- Spouse: Steve Lincoln (m. 1994)
- Children: 2
- Relatives: Mary Lambert (sister); See Lincoln family (by marriage)
- Education: University of Arkansas (attended); Randolph College (BS)
- Lincoln's voice Lincoln questioning Peter Orszag, CBO director, at a Senate Finance Committee hearing on economic stimuli. Recorded January 22, 2008

Blanche Lambert Lincoln (born Blanche Meyers Lambert; September 30, 1960) is an American politician who served as a United States senator from Arkansas from 1999 to 2011. A member of the Democratic Party, she was first elected to the Senate in 1998; she was the first woman elected to the Senate from Arkansas since Hattie Caraway in 1932 and youngest woman ever elected to the Senate at age 38. She previously served in the U.S. House of Representatives, representing Arkansas's 1st congressional district from 1993 to 1997.

Lincoln was the first woman and the first Arkansan to serve as chair of the U.S. Senate Committee on Agriculture, Nutrition and Forestry. She also served as the Chair of Rural Outreach for the Senate Democratic Caucus. In 2010, she ran for a third term, but was defeated in a landslide by Republican John Boozman, whose brother, Fay Boozman, she had defeated in 1998. She is the founder and a principal of Lincoln Policy Group, a consulting firm.

== Early life, education and private career ==
A seventh-generation Arkansan, Blanche Lambert was born in Helena, Phillips County, the daughter of Martha (née Kelly) and Jordan Bennett Lambert. Her father was a rice and cotton farmer. Her older sister, Mary Lambert, is a film director. She received her early education at the local public schools in Helena, and was the student council president at Central High School from 1977 to 1978.

Lincoln attended the University of Arkansas in Fayetteville, where she was a member of the Chi Omega sorority. She graduated from Randolph-Macon Woman's College (now known as Randolph College) in Lynchburg, Virginia, in 1982, earning a Bachelor of Science degree in biology. She originally sought to go into nursing.

After graduating from college, Lincoln served as a staff assistant for U.S. Representative Bill Alexander, a Democrat from Arkansas's 1st congressional district. She remained in Alexander's office until 1984.

Her husband Steve Lincoln is a distant relative of former President Abraham Lincoln.

Lincoln is an Episcopalian.

== U.S. House of Representatives (1993–1997) ==
In 1992, Lincoln defeated Bill Alexander in the Democratic primary, by a margin of 60 to 40 percent. She subsequently won the general election, beating Republican Terry Hayes with 70% of the vote. Her election to the House coincided with the election of fellow Arkansan Bill Clinton as President of the United States.

She called herself a centrist Democrat and was among the minority of Democrats to support CAFTA. While in the House, she was one of only 17 Democrats to vote for the Teamwork for Employees and Managers Act of 1995 which sought to change federal employment laws. The law was vetoed by President Bill Clinton. She voted in favor restricting class action lawsuits and tightening rules on personal bankruptcy. Lincoln was also one of the few Democrats in Congress to vote in favor of Bush administration's tax cuts and she supports the permanent elimination of the estate tax.

On April 5, 1995 she was one of only 27 Democrats in the House to vote in favor of the Contract With America Tax Relief Act, which was approved by the House. Lincoln also co-sponsored and supported legislation to amend the constitution to require a balanced-budget amendment. In 1996, she championed the Freedom to Farm Act.

She was reelected to a second term under her married name, Blanche Lincoln, and served in the House of Representatives until 1997. Lincoln chose not to run for reelection in 1996; she was pregnant at that time.

In 1993, Lincoln (then under her maiden name Lambert) became one of the first three women to play in the annual Congressional Baseball Game, alongside Ileana Ros-Lehtinen and Maria Cantwell.

== U.S. Senate (1999–2011) ==
=== First term (1999–2005) ===
In 1998, Lincoln returned to politics and ran for the United States Senate seat being vacated by incumbent Senator Dale Bumpers. She defeated her Republican opponent, Fay Boozman, a state senator and the brother of future U.S. Representative John Boozman, by a 55% to 42% margin.

Lincoln concentrated primarily on issues involving farmers and rural issues. She was one of the primary advocates of the Delta Regional Authority, which is designed to spur development in the lower Mississippi Delta region.

=== Second term (2005–2011) ===
In 2004, Lincoln was re-elected, defeating Republican state Senator Jim Holt (R-Springdale) by a margin of 56% to 44%, even as President Bush carried the state with 54% of the vote.

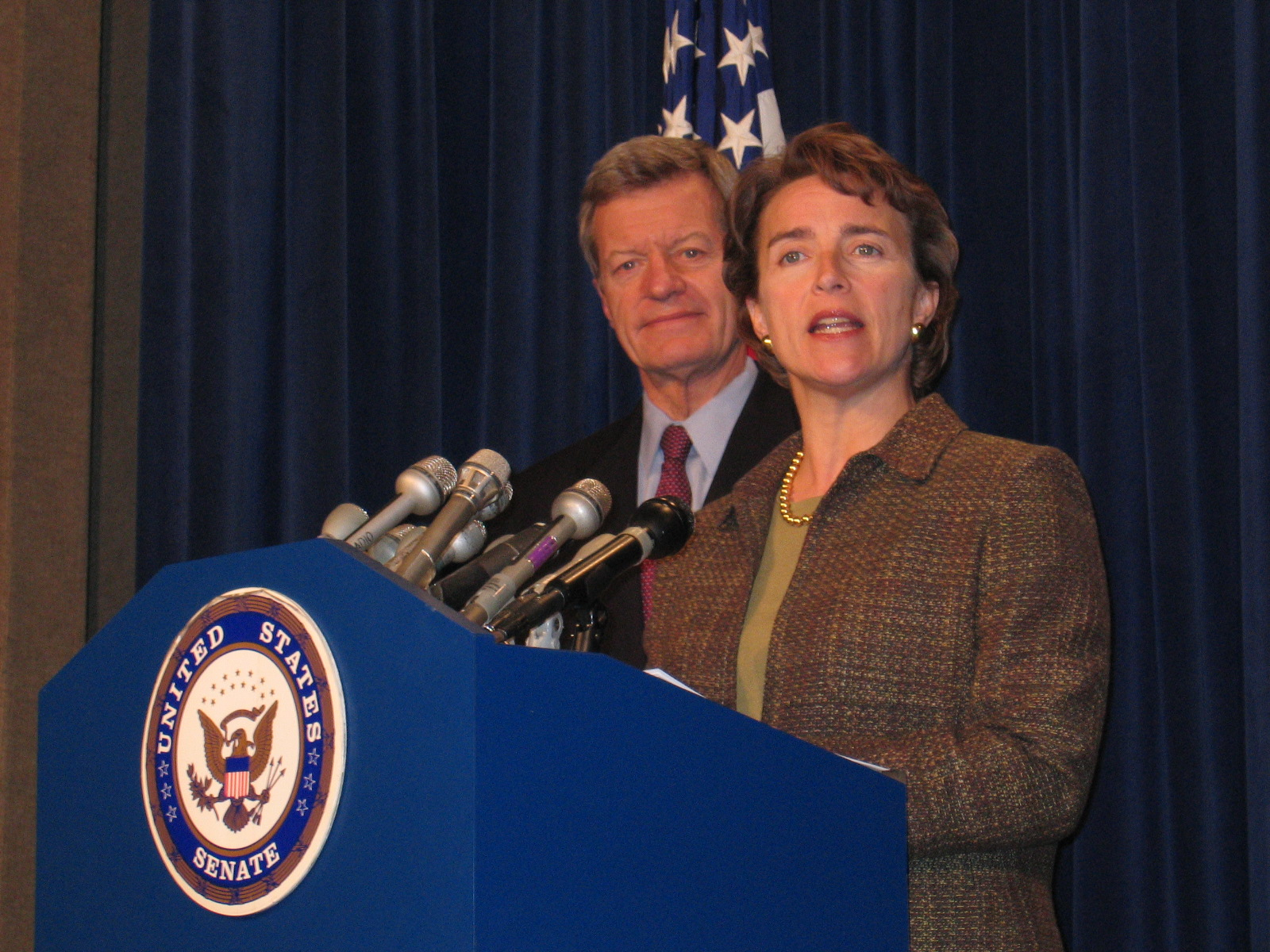
Lincoln holds a press conference in 2006 with Sen. Max Baucus (D-MT), chairman of the Senate Finance Committee regarding proposed changes to Medicare.

In March 2007, Lincoln called for the resignation of U.S. Attorney General Alberto Gonzales, claiming that the firing of eight federal prosecutors created a "serious breach between the Justice Department and Congress, a breach that I'm not sure can be repaired with Mr. Gonzales at the helm." She and Senator Pryor were particularly upset that Gonzales reneged on a promise to have a replacement for Bud Cummins, U.S. Attorney for the Eastern District of Arkansas, go through a Senate confirmation. Gonzales resigned in August 2007.

In 2007, Lincoln played a key role in brokering the compromise that led to passage of the Food, Conservation, and Energy Act of 2008. Also known as the “farm bill,” this legislation provides resources for nutrition, conservation, rural development, and renewable energy. Lincoln led the charge against defeating an amendment to the pending Farm Bill which would have capped government Agricultural subsidy payments at $250,000 per year, per farm. According to Lincoln, it was unfair to some farmers in her state, notably cotton growers. Even though the amendment passed (56–43), Lincoln threatened a filibuster if any amendment did not get a 60-vote majority, so the amendment was withdrawn after passage.

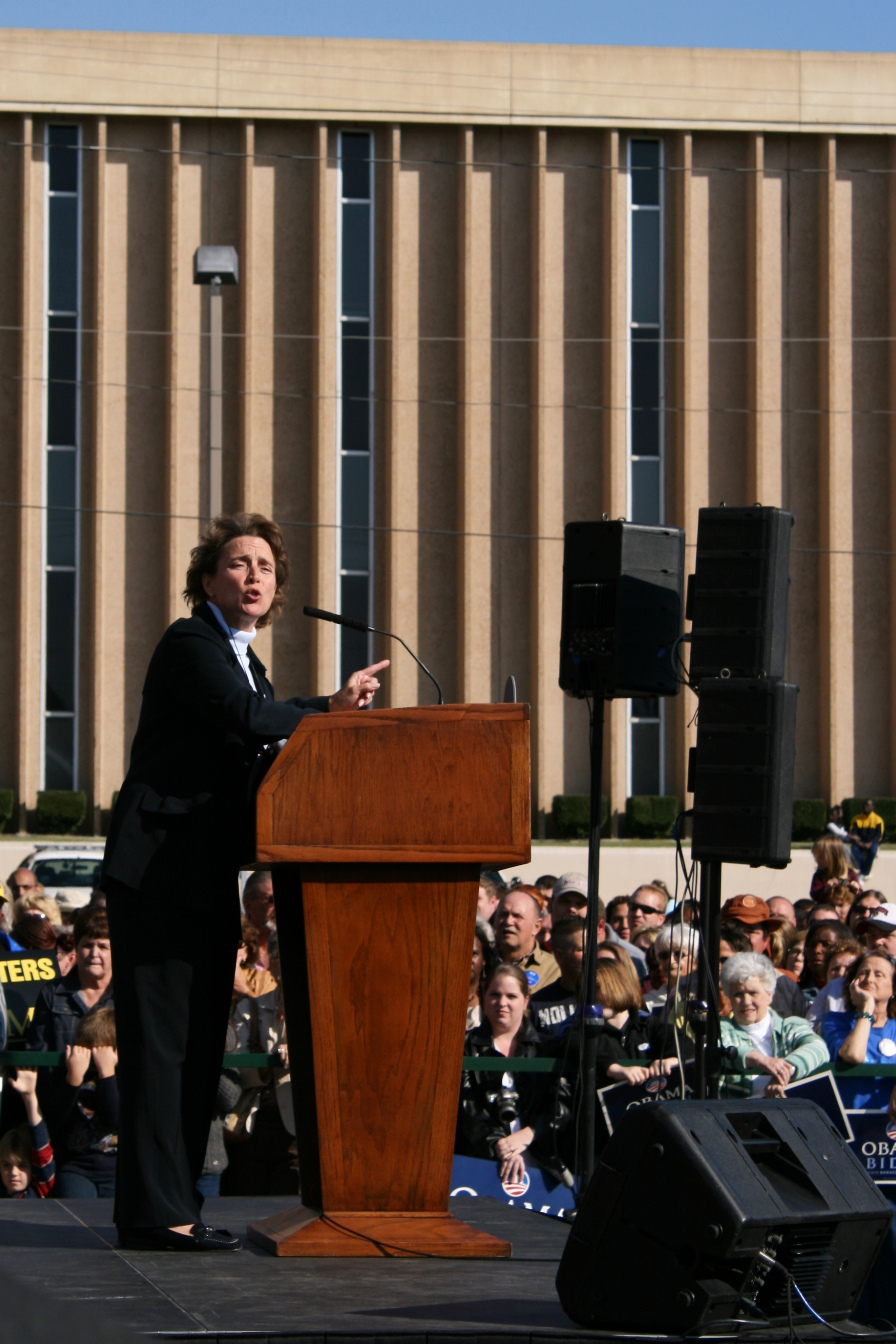
Senator Lincoln speaking in Jonesboro, Arkansas, on October 25, 2008.

Lincoln was in the 2007 documentary 14 Women, directed by her older sister, Mary Lambert.

In September 2009, Lincoln pledged to filibuster any legislation containing a public health insurance option, such as the Affordable Health Care for America Act (the Democratic-controlled, House of Representatives' preferred health care reform bill). This move came as a surprise to liberal Democrats, who largely interpreted the move as a betrayal of traditional Democratic values. Lincoln voted in favor of the Affordable Care Act, the Senate bill that eventually became the Barack Obama administration's health care reform law. However, she voted against the Health Care and Education Reconciliation Act of 2010, a package of amendments to the Affordable Care Act—passed via reconciliation process, to circumvent united Republican attempts to block the bill's passage—in the Senate.

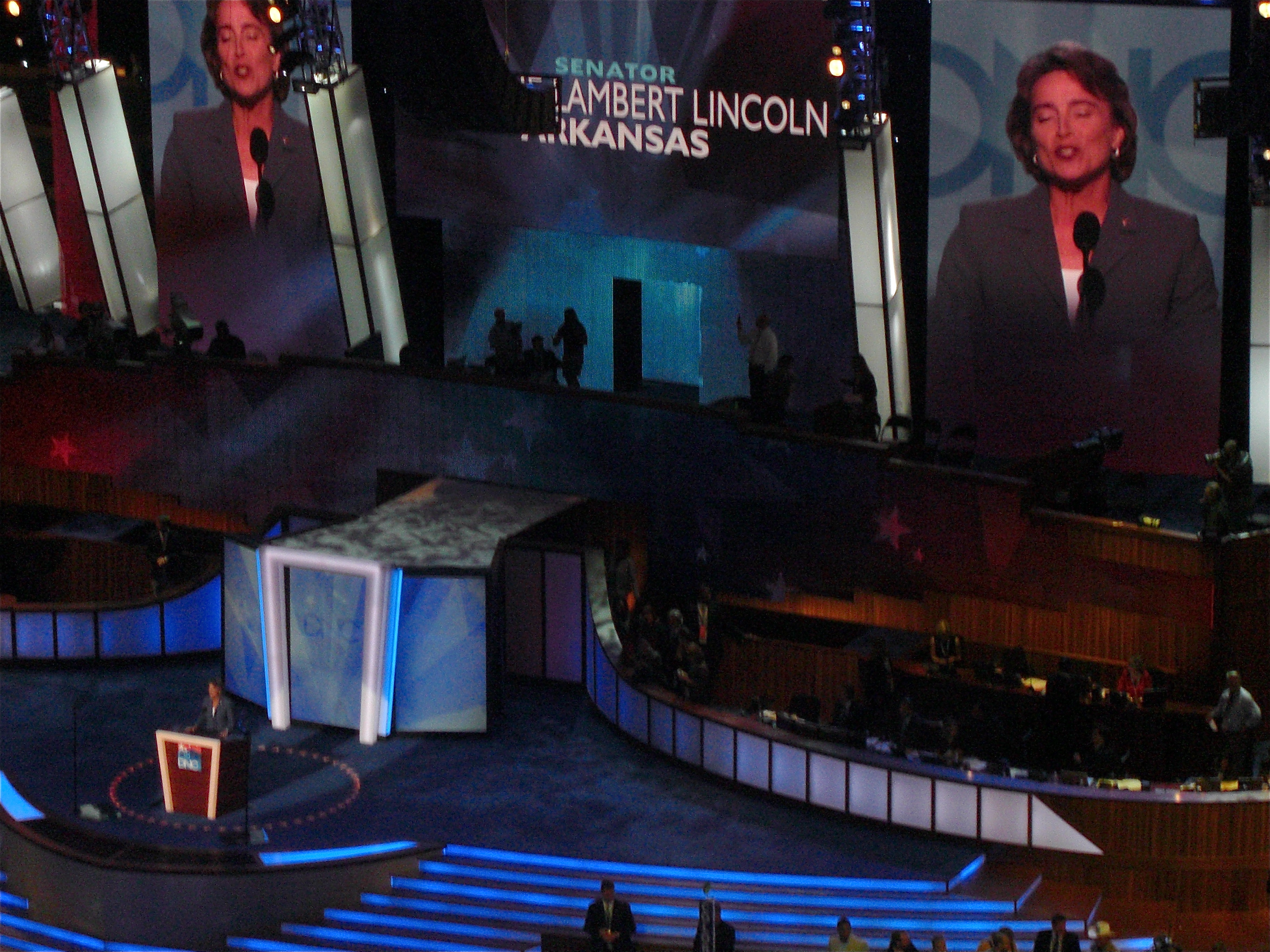
Lincoln speaks during the second day of the 2008 Democratic National Convention in Denver, Colorado.

Lincoln's votes on health care appeared to be positioning her as a high-profile, "conservative Democrat", to avoid being perceived as a "liberal" by an Arkansas voting public that had turned increasingly Republican. In 2009, she spoke out in opposition to the pro-labor union bill known as the Employee Free Choice Act; this garnering her the praise of conservative interest groups like Americans for Tax Reform, but also bitter criticisms from labor unions, who publicly threatened to discourage Arkansas' remaining Democratic-leaning voters from voting for her.

In November 2009, Lincoln voted against bringing Guantanamo Bay prisoners to the United States for trial. In 2010, she introduced legislation to ban sports gambling on prediction markets; the bill failed to pass.

On December 9, 2010, Lincoln missed, by three minutes, a critical vote to repeal Don't ask, don't tell after a dental appointment. A supporter of the bill, Sen. Joe Lieberman, told reporters: "She was very frustrated and apologized to both of us." She said she would have voted for repeal had she made the vote. On December 18, she voted in favor of final passage of the bill.

=== 2010 re–election campaign ===
With the Obama administration having become hugely unpopular in her home state, Lincoln's re-election strategy in 2010 was to depict herself to Arkansas voters as independent of the Democrats. After first narrowly surviving a primary challenge by the state's then-Lieutenant Governor Bill Halter with an early endorsement from former President and Governor of Arkansas Bill Clinton, Lincoln lost in November 2010 to Republican congressman John Boozman by a landslide, 58% to 37%.

=== Caucuses and committees ===
In 2004, Lincoln co-founded the Senate Hunger Caucus. The caucus was established to provide a bi-partisan forum for Senators and staff to discuss, advance and engage the Senate's work on national and international hunger and food insecurity issues.

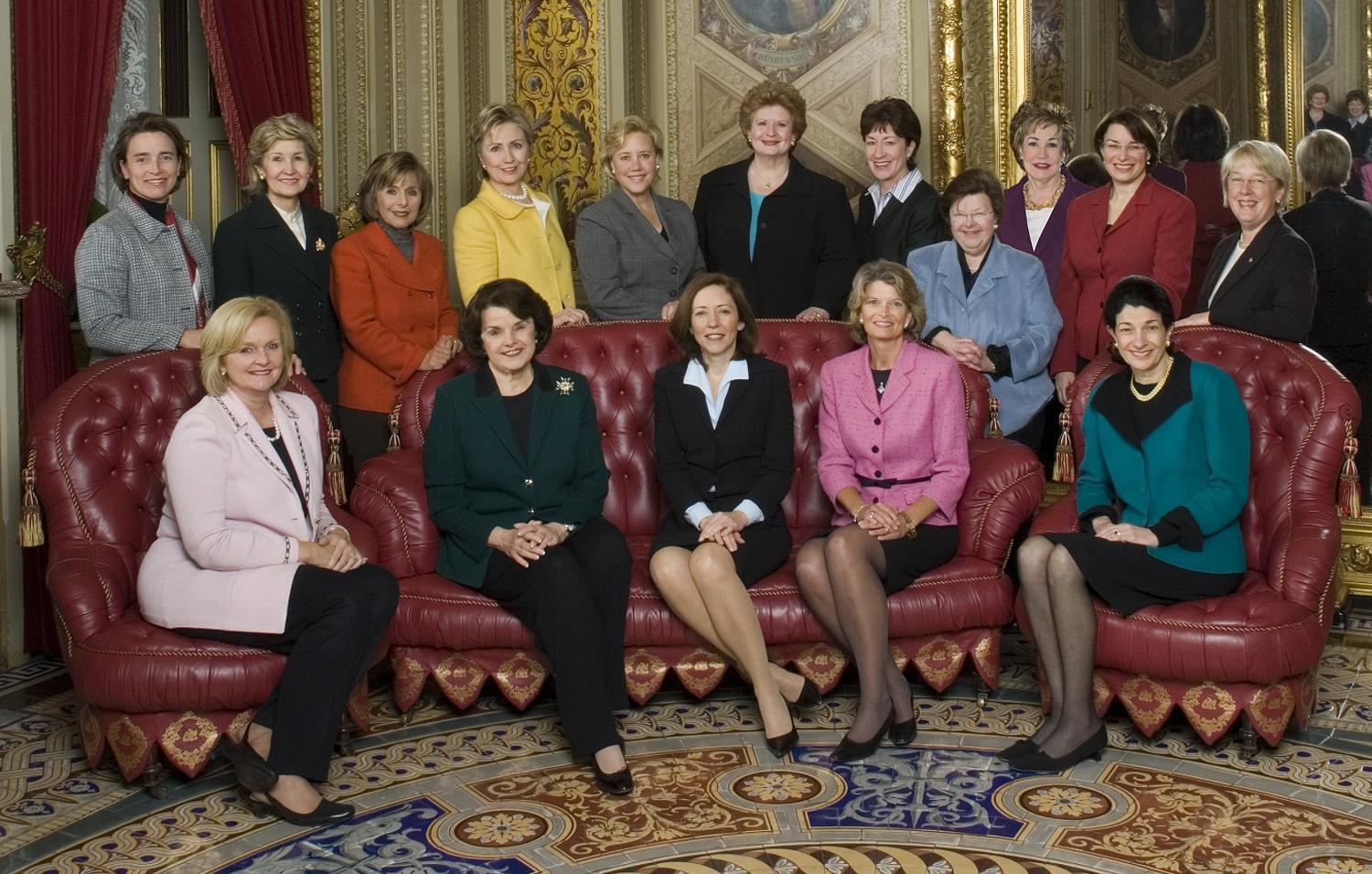
Lincoln with other female Senators of the 110th Congress

Lincoln also helped form the Moderate Dems Working Group, a coalition of moderate Senate Democrats whose stated goal is to work with Senate leadership and the administration toward finding bipartisan solutions to controversial political issues. In addition, she co-founded and currently co-chairs Third Way, a moderate think-tank whose self-described goals are "an economic agenda that is focused on growth and middle class success; a culture of shared values; a national security approach that is both tough and smart; and a clean energy revolution."

Lincoln served on the Senate Finance Committee; Special Committee on Aging; Senate Committee on Energy and Natural Resources; Senate Social Security Task Force; Rural Health Caucus; Senate New Democrat Coalition and chair of the Rural Outreach for the Senate Democratic Caucus.

On September 9, 2009, she became Chairman of the Senate Agriculture, Nutrition, and Forestry Committee. In the Committee’s 184-year history, she was the first Arkansan and the first woman to serve as Chairman.

== Lobbying career (2011-present) ==
Lincoln remained in Washington after her re-election loss in November 2010, working as Special Policy Advisor at the firm of Alston & Bird.

In 2011 Lincoln became chair of Small Business for Sensible Regulations, a project of the National Federation of Independent Business.

In July 2013, Lincoln founded her own political consulting firm called Lincoln Policy Group.

As of November 2020, Lincoln is an advisor of the RATE Coalition (Reforming America’s Taxes Equitably), which has lobbied for lower corporate tax rates during the Biden administration. In 2024, she began lobbying on behalf of prediction market Kalshi and has lobbied the Commodity Futures Trading Commission to allow sports gambling on prediction markets.

== Electoral history ==
1992 Arkansas's 1st congressional district – Democratic primary
Party	Candidate	Votes	%	±%
Democratic	Blanche Lambert	85,205	60.50%	
Democratic	Bill Alexander (incumbent)	55,623	39.50%	

1992 Arkansas's 1st congressional district – general election
Party	Candidate	Votes	%	±%
Democratic	Blanche Lambert	149,558	69.83%	
Republican	Terry Hayes	64,618	30.17%	

1994 Arkansas's 1st congressional district – general election
Party	Candidate	Votes	%	±%
Democratic	Blanche Lambert (incumbent)	95,290	53.40%	
Republican	Warren Dupwe	83,147	46.60%	

1998 United States Senate election in Arkansas – Democratic primary
Party	Candidate	Votes	%	±%
Democratic	Blanche Lambert Lincoln	145,009	45.49%	
Democratic	Winston Bryant	87,183	27.35%	
Democratic	Scott Ferguson	44,761	14.04%	
Democratic	Nate Coulter	41,848	13.13%	

1998 United States Senate election in Arkansas – Democratic primary runoff
Party	Candidate	Votes	%	±%
Democratic	Blanche Lambert Lincoln	134,203	62.39%	
Democratic	Winston Bryant	80,889	37.61%	

1998 United States Senate election in Arkansas – general election
Party	Candidate	Votes	%	±%
Democratic	Blanche Lambert Lincoln	385,878	53.40%	
Republican	Fay Boozman	295,870	42.22%	
Independent	Charley E. Heffley	18,896	2.70%	

2004 United States Senate election in Arkansas – general election
Party	Candidate	Votes	%	±%
Democratic	Blanche Lambert Lincoln (incumbent)	580,973	55.90%	
Republican	Jim Holt	458,036	44.07%	

2010 United States Senate election in Arkansas – Democratic primary
Party	Candidate	Votes	%	±%
Democratic	Blanche Lambert Lincoln (incumbent)	146,579	44.50%	
Democratic	Bill Halter	140,081	42.53%	
Democratic	DC Morrison	42,695	12.96%	

2010 United States Senate election in Arkansas – Democratic primary runoff
Party	Candidate	Votes	%	±%
Democratic	Blanche Lambert Lincoln (incumbent)	134,756	52.00%	
Democratic	Bill Halter	124,405	48.00%	

2010 United States Senate election in Arkansas – general election
Party	Candidate	Votes	%	±%
Republican	John Boozman	451,618	57.90%	
Democratic	Blanche Lambert Lincoln (incumbent)	288,156	36.95%	
Independent	Trevor Drown	25,234	3.24%	
Green	John Laney Gray, III	14,430	1.85%	

== See also ==
- Women in the United States Senate

U.S. House of Representatives
Preceded by William Alexander	Member of the U.S. House of Representatives from Arkansas's 1st congressional district 1993–1997	Succeeded by Robert Berry
Party political offices
Preceded by Dale Bumpers	Democratic nominee for U.S. Senator from Arkansas (Class 3); 1998, 2004, 2010	Succeeded by Conner Eldridge
U.S. Senate
Preceded by Dale Bumpers	U.S. Senator (Class 3) from Arkansas; 1999–2011; Served alongside: Tim Hutchinson, Mark Pryor	Succeeded by John Boozman
Preceded by Tom Harkin	Chair of the Senate Agriculture Committee; 2009–2011	Succeeded by Debbie Stabenow
U.S. order of precedence (ceremonial)
Preceded by Roy Blunt as Former U.S. Senator	Order of precedence of the United States as Former U.S. Senator	Succeeded by Mark Pryor as Former U.S. Senator
