= Chair of Rural Outreach =

The Chair of Rural Outreach was a post in the Democratic party leadership of the United States Senate responsible for "guiding rural outreach for the Caucus", and overseeing engagement with "rural, suburban, and exurban American communities". The position was created in the 109th Congress, and was held by Blanche Lincoln of Arkansas. As of the 112th Congress the position no longer exists.
