= Moderate Dems Working Group =

Caucus of the United States Senate

Moderate Dems Working Group was a caucus of moderate Democratic members of the United States Senate. The group's goal was to work with the Senate leadership, and the Obama administration "to craft common-sense solutions to urgent national problems." The group's members are "joined by a shared commitment to pursue pragmatic, fiscally sustainable policies across a range of issues, such as deficit containment, health care reform, the housing crisis, educational reform, energy policy and climate change."

The Moderate Dems Working Group was founded on March 18, 2009, and was led by Senators Evan Bayh of Indiana, Tom Carper of Delaware, and Blanche Lincoln of Arkansas. It has been described, as the Senate version of the New Democrat Coalition in the House. The coalition has received praise from Democratic Senate Majority Leader Harry Reid, but has been criticized by the left as simply being "political cover to Democratic senators representing red or purple states, making it harder for Republicans to tie them to liberal bogeymen."

== Members ==
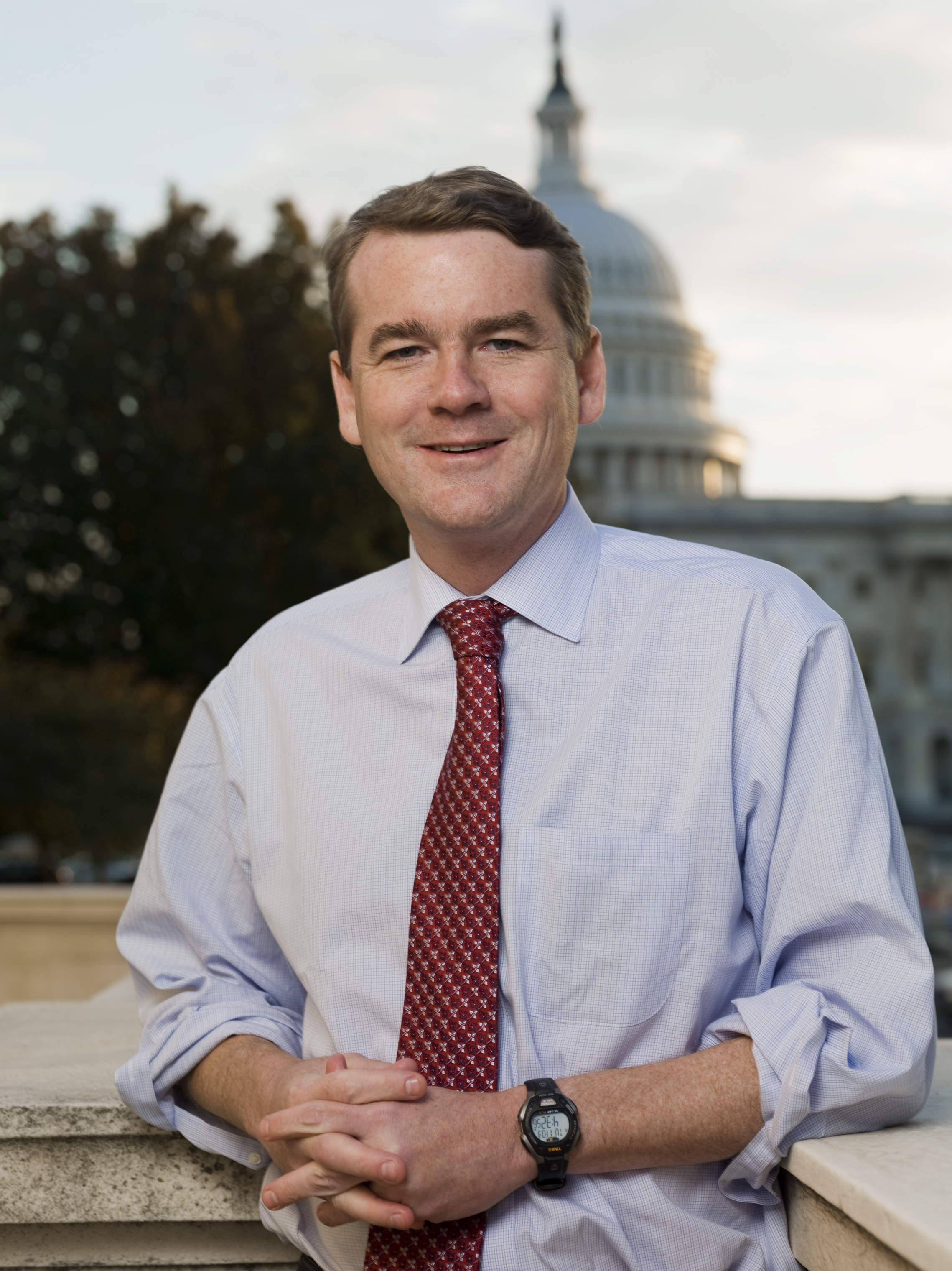
Michael Bennet, Colorado

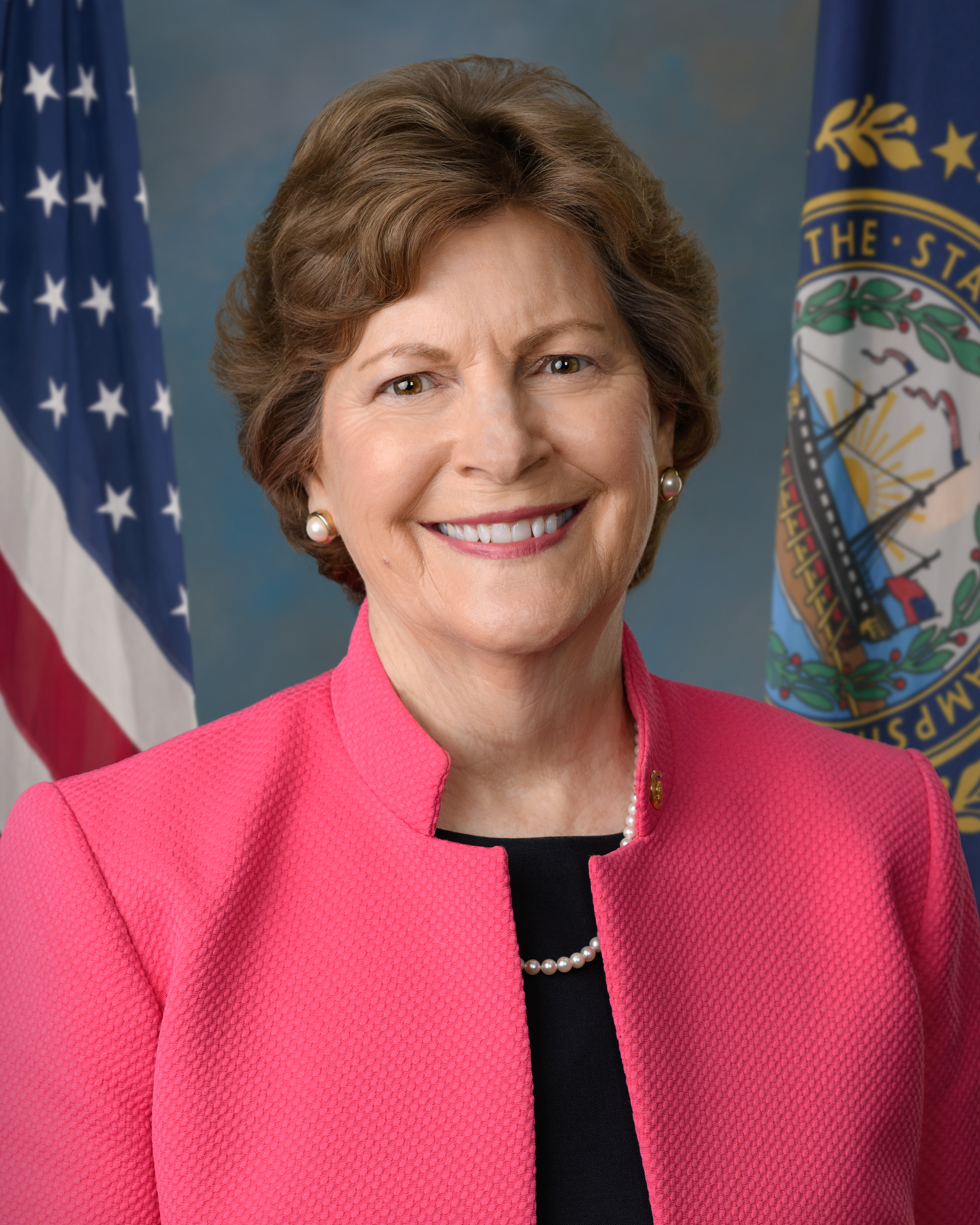
Jeanne Shaheen, New Hampshire

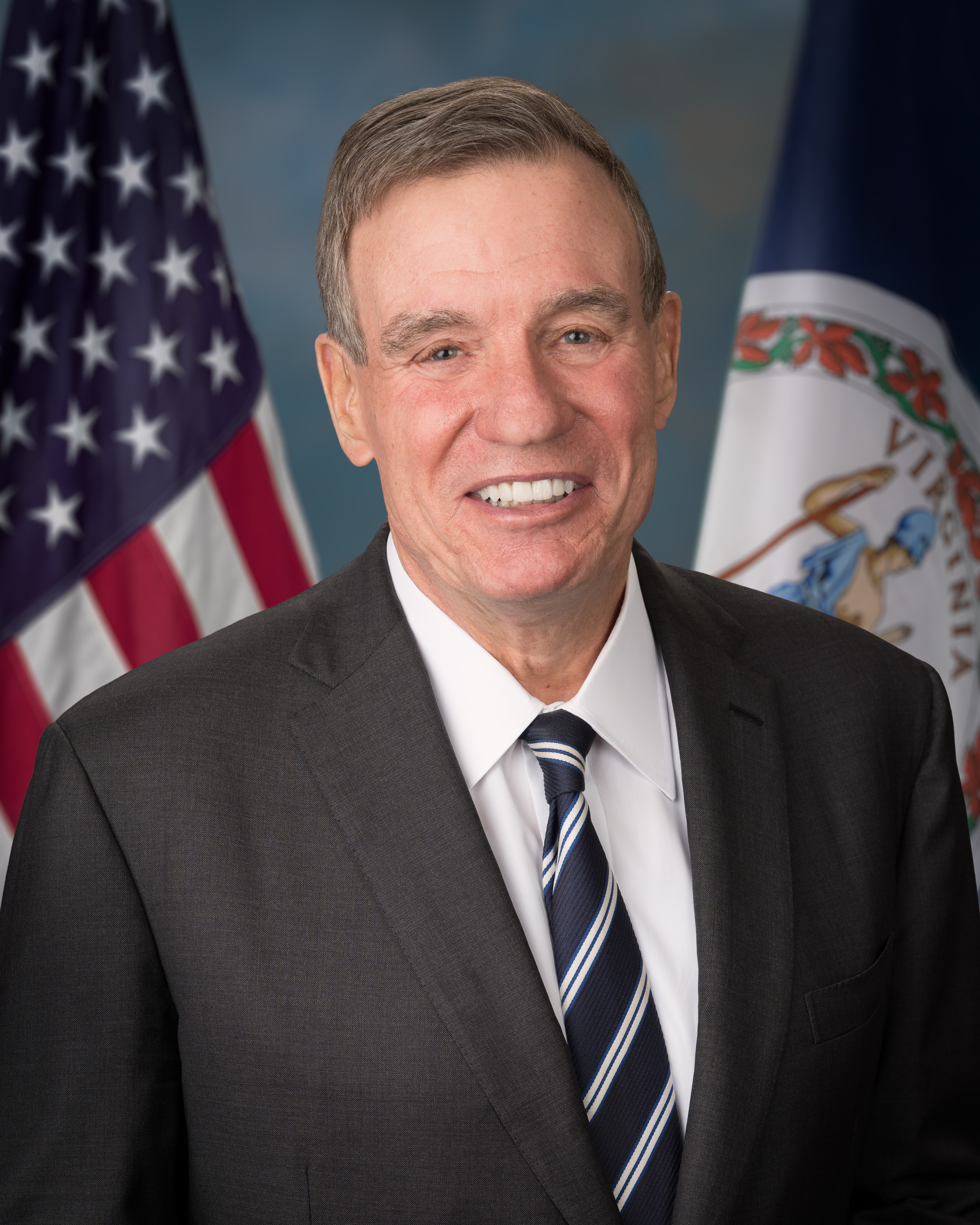
Mark Warner, Virginia

== Former members ==
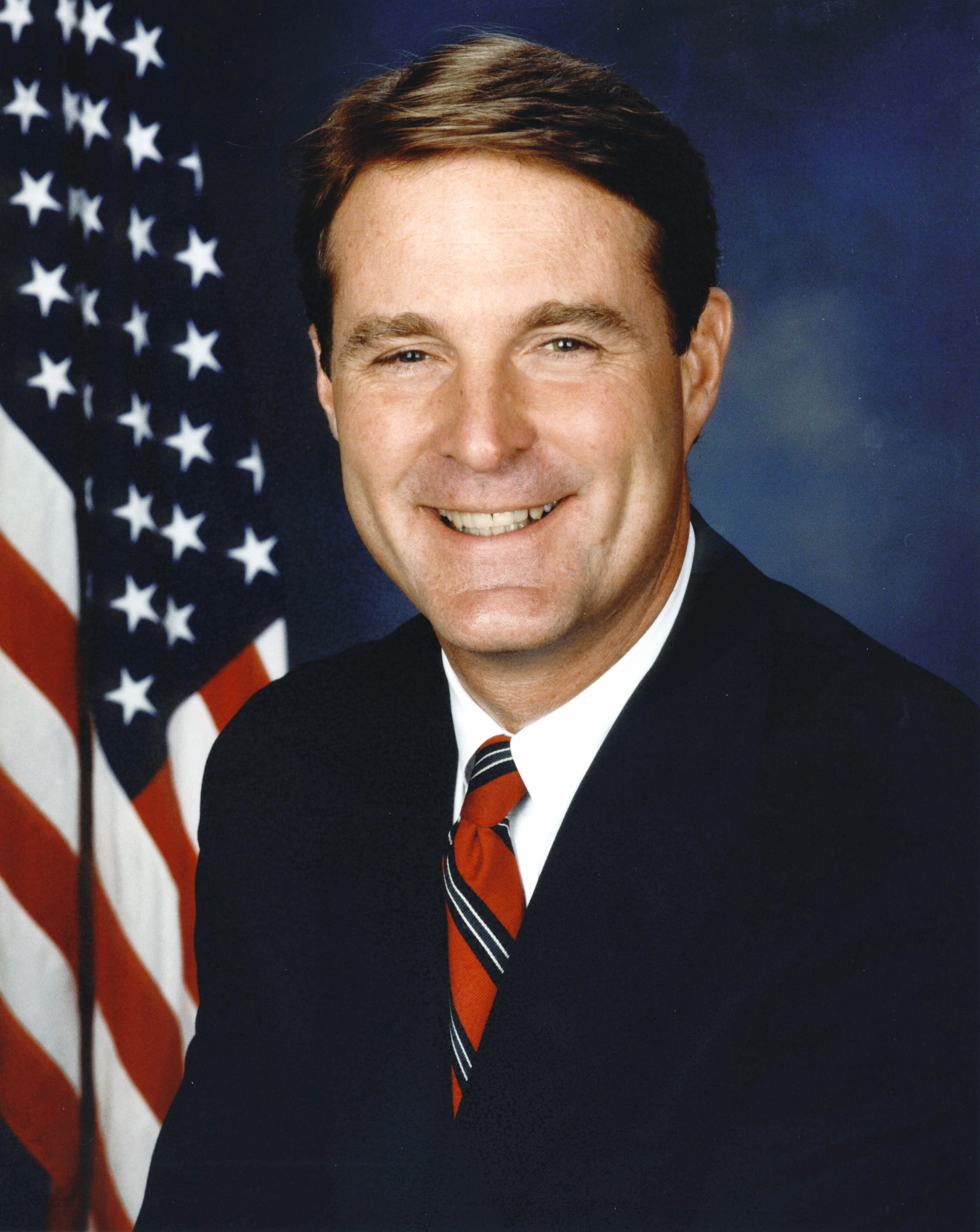
Evan Bayh, Indiana

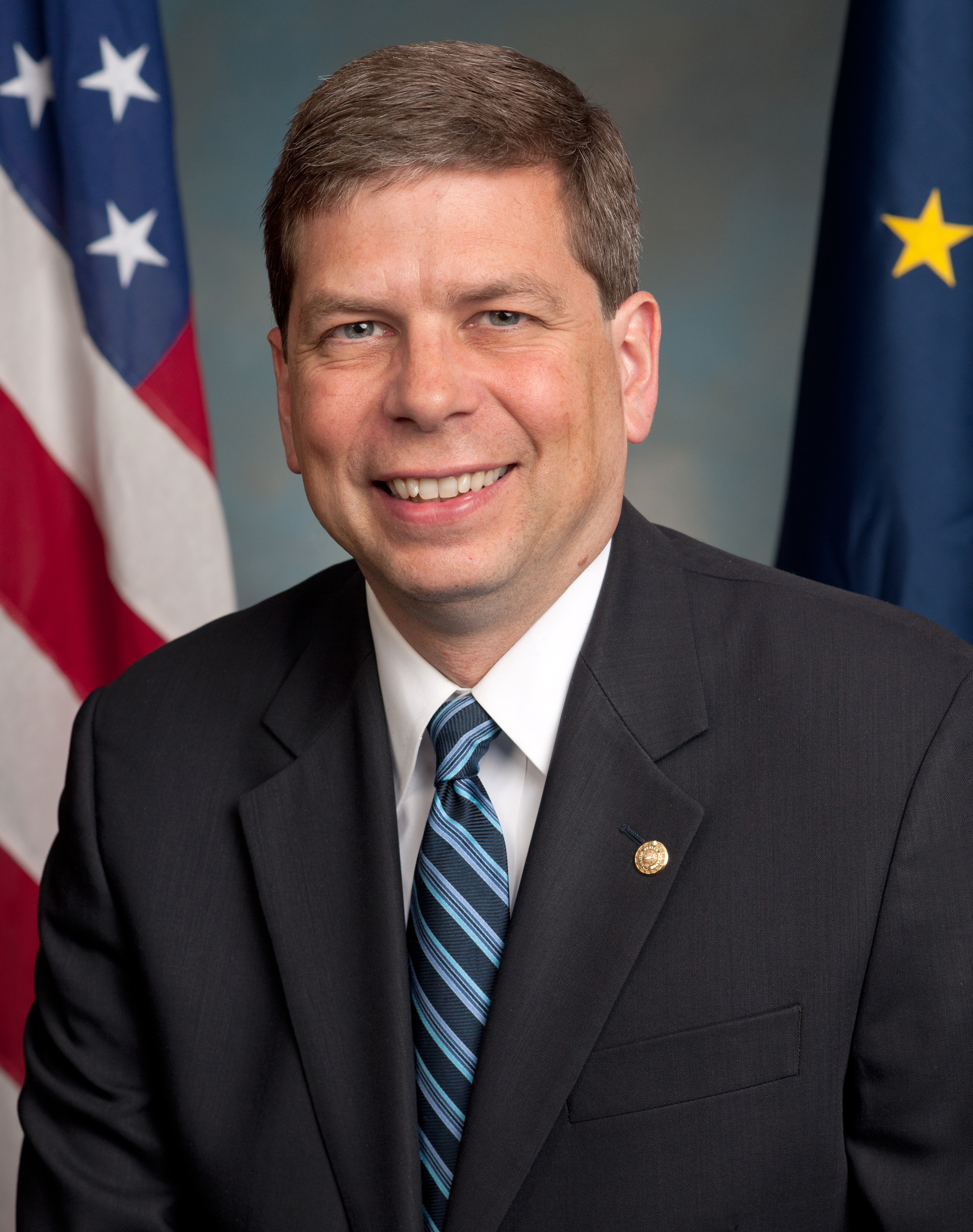
Mark Begich, Alaska

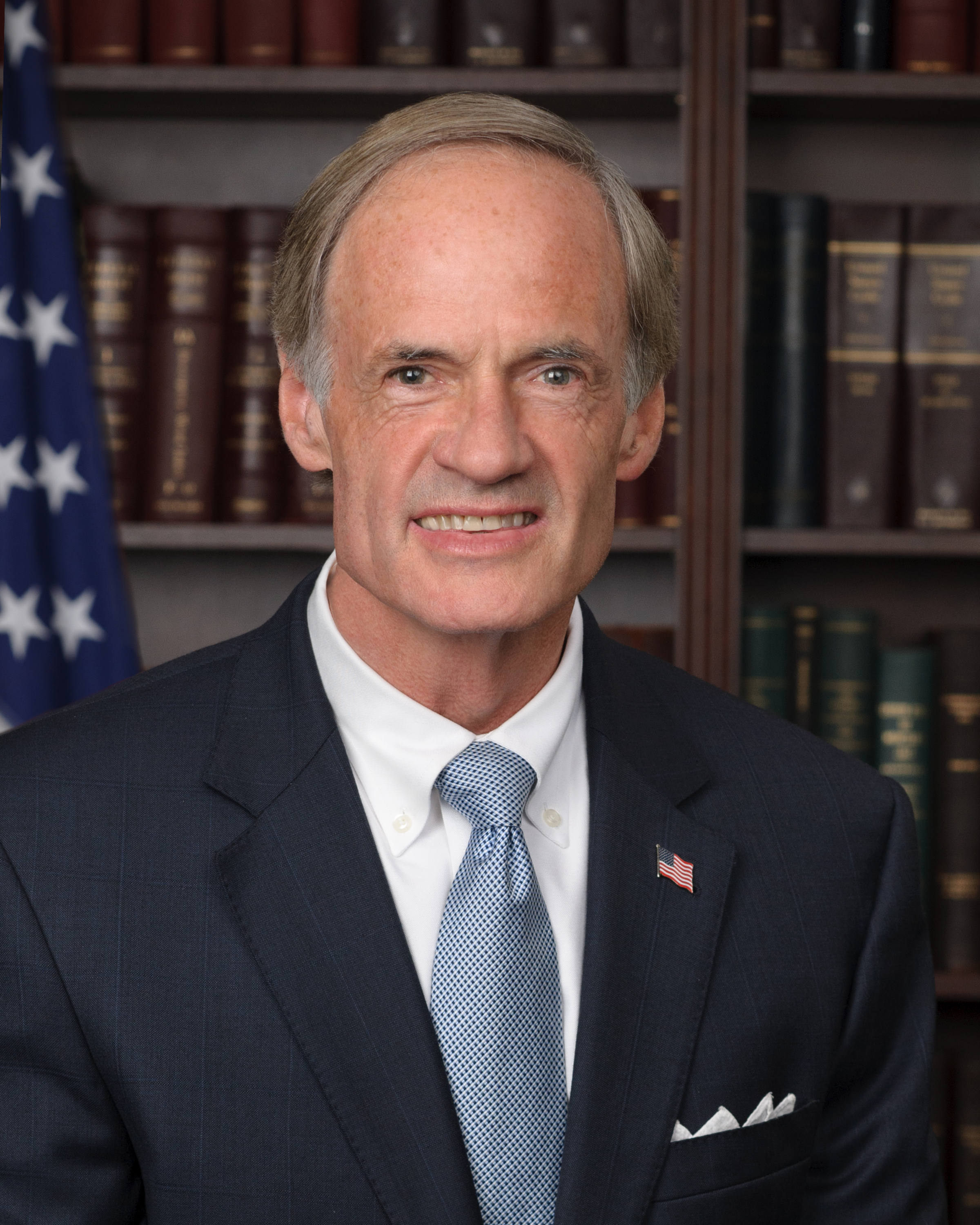
Tom Carper, Delaware

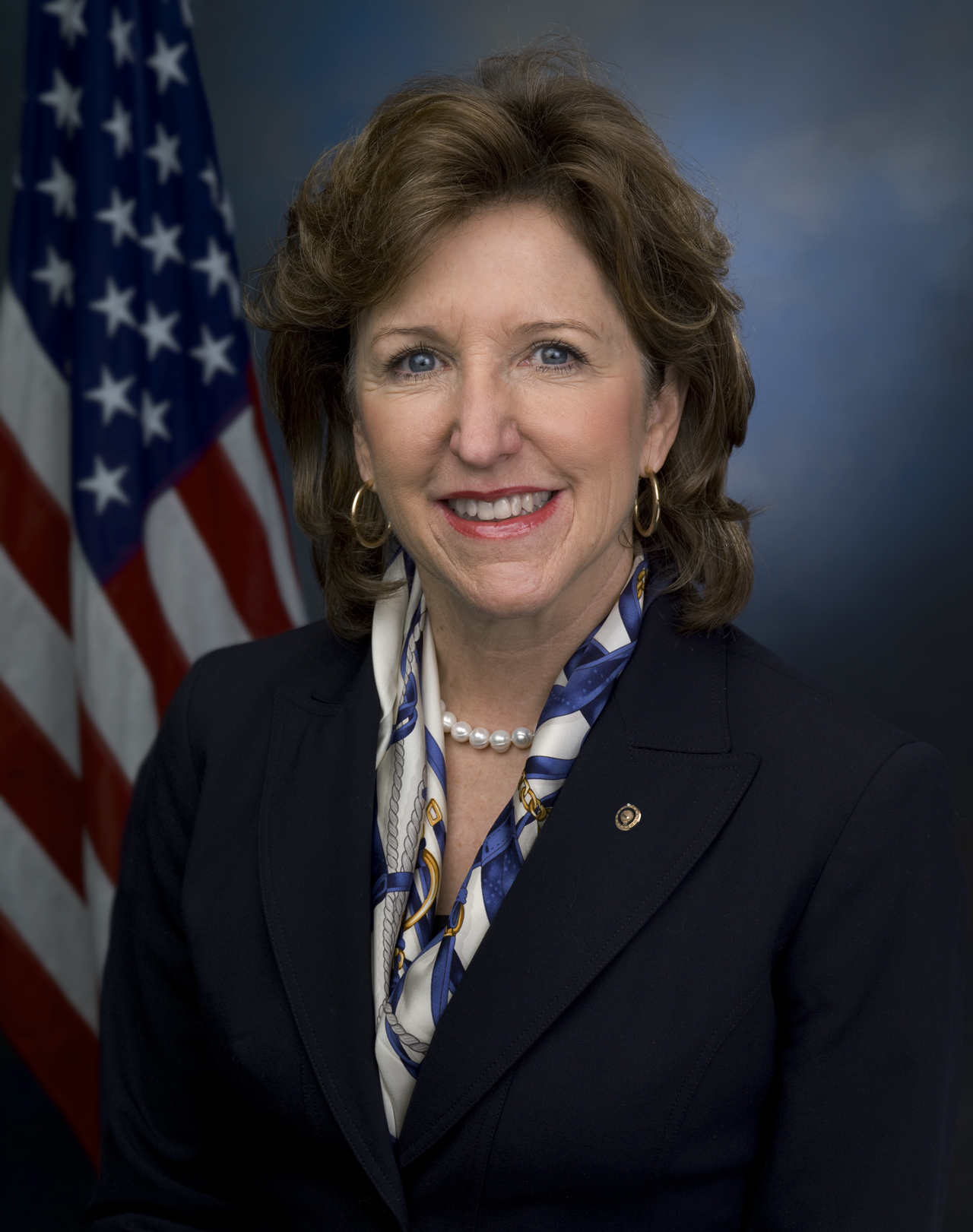
Kay Hagan, North Carolina

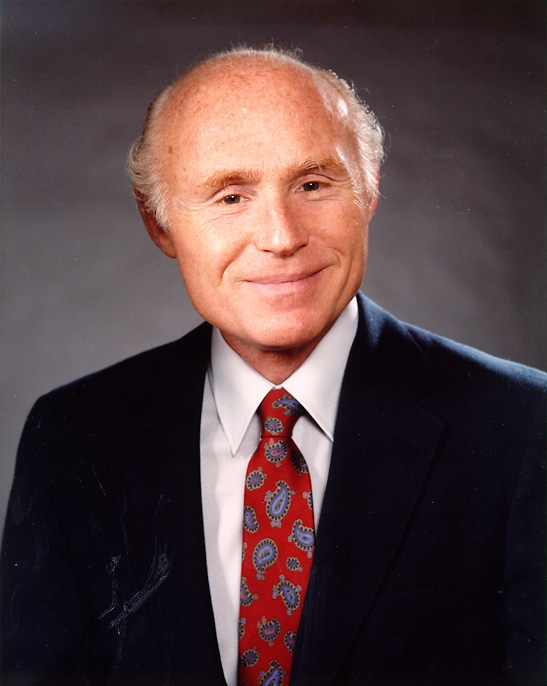
Herb Kohl, Wisconsin

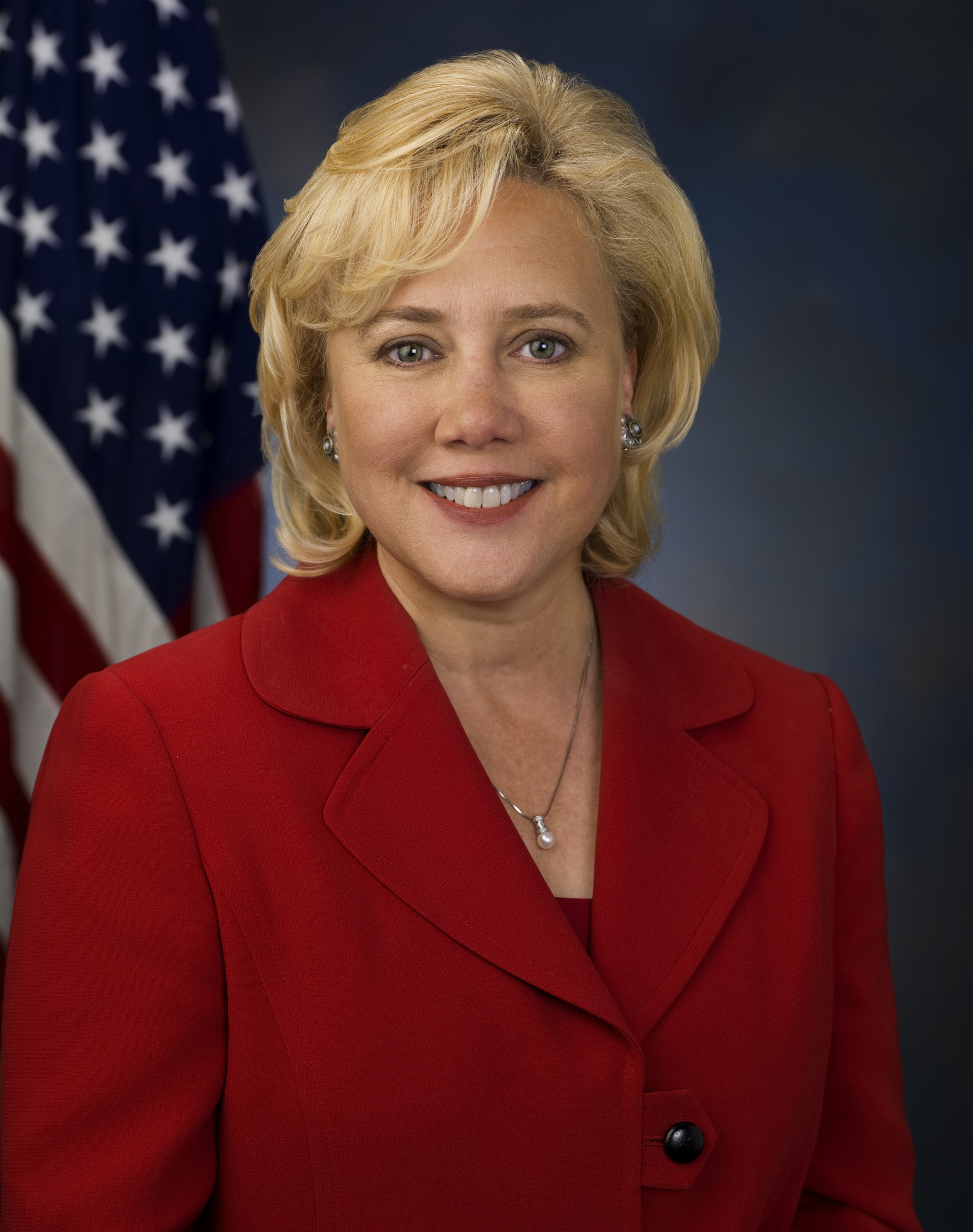
Mary Landrieu, Louisiana

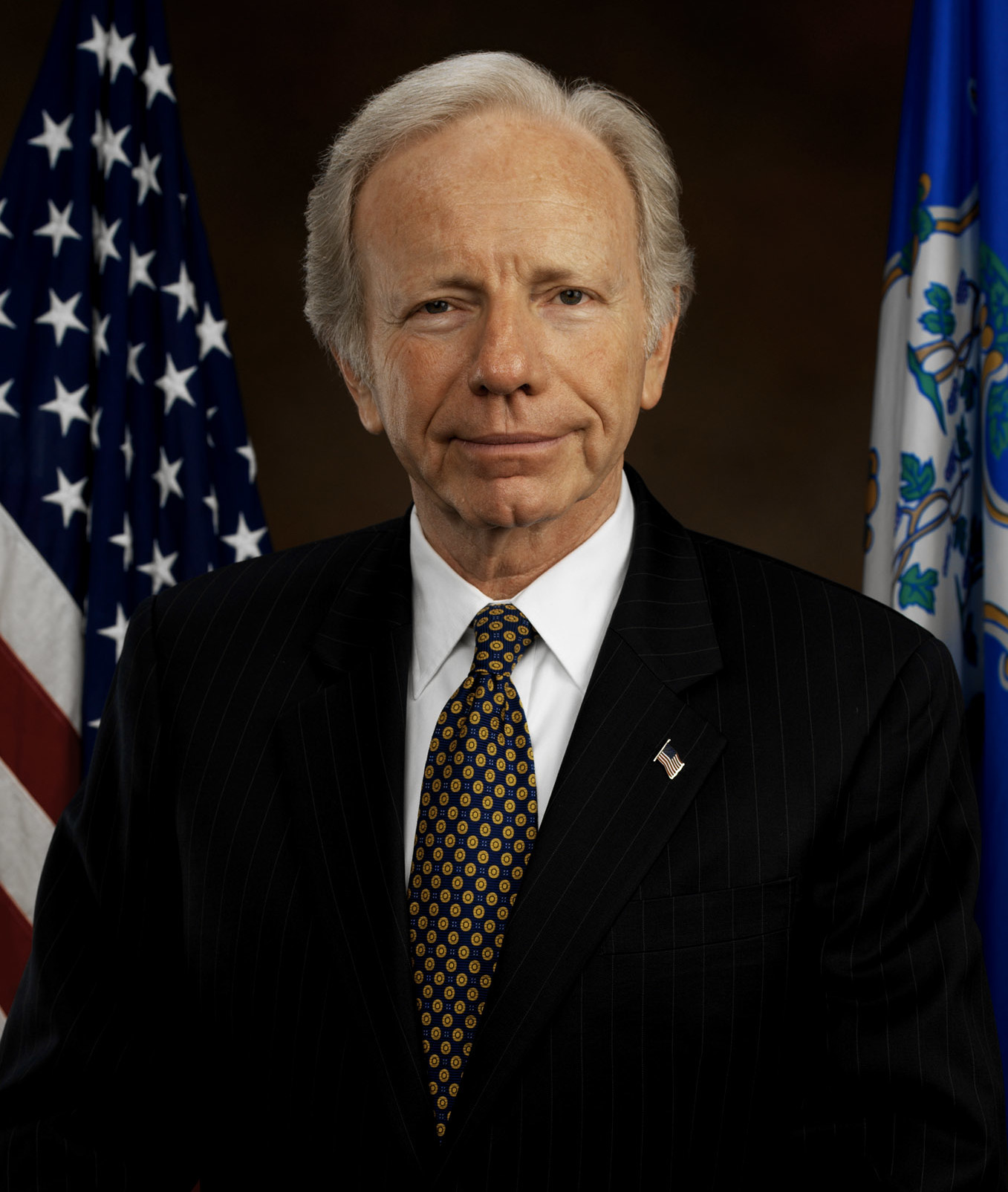
Joe Lieberman, Connecticut

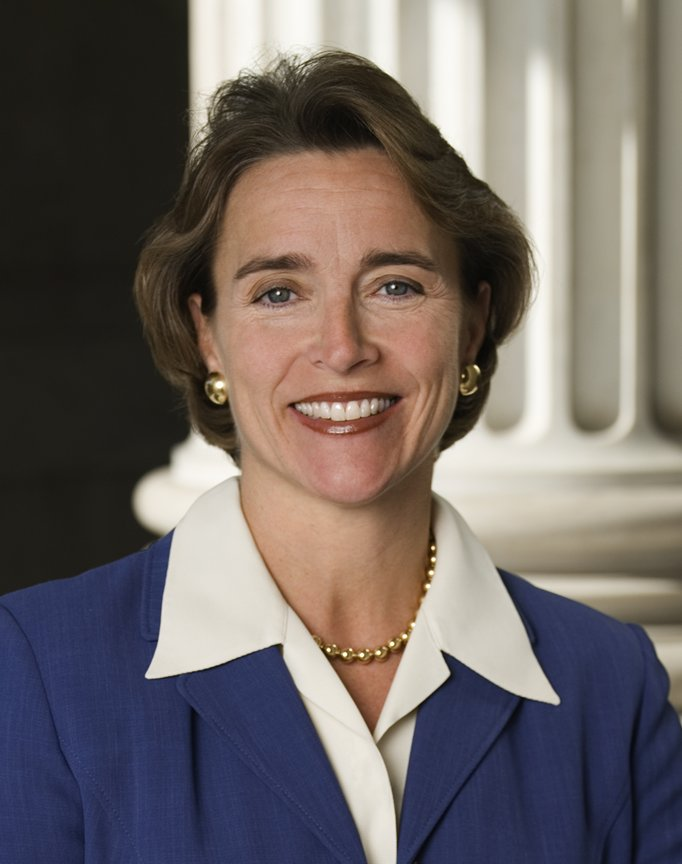
Blanche Lincoln, Arkansas

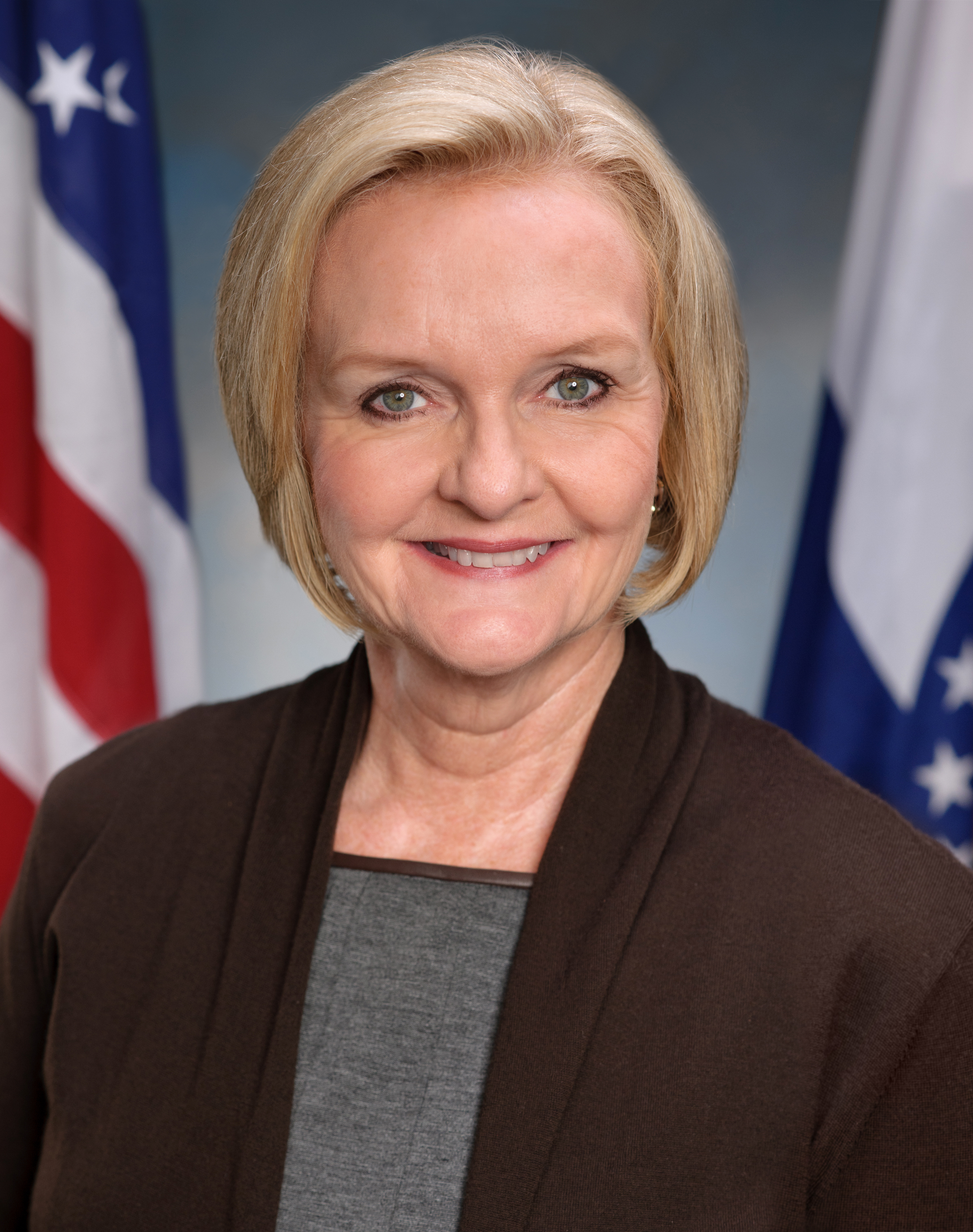
Claire McCaskill, Missouri

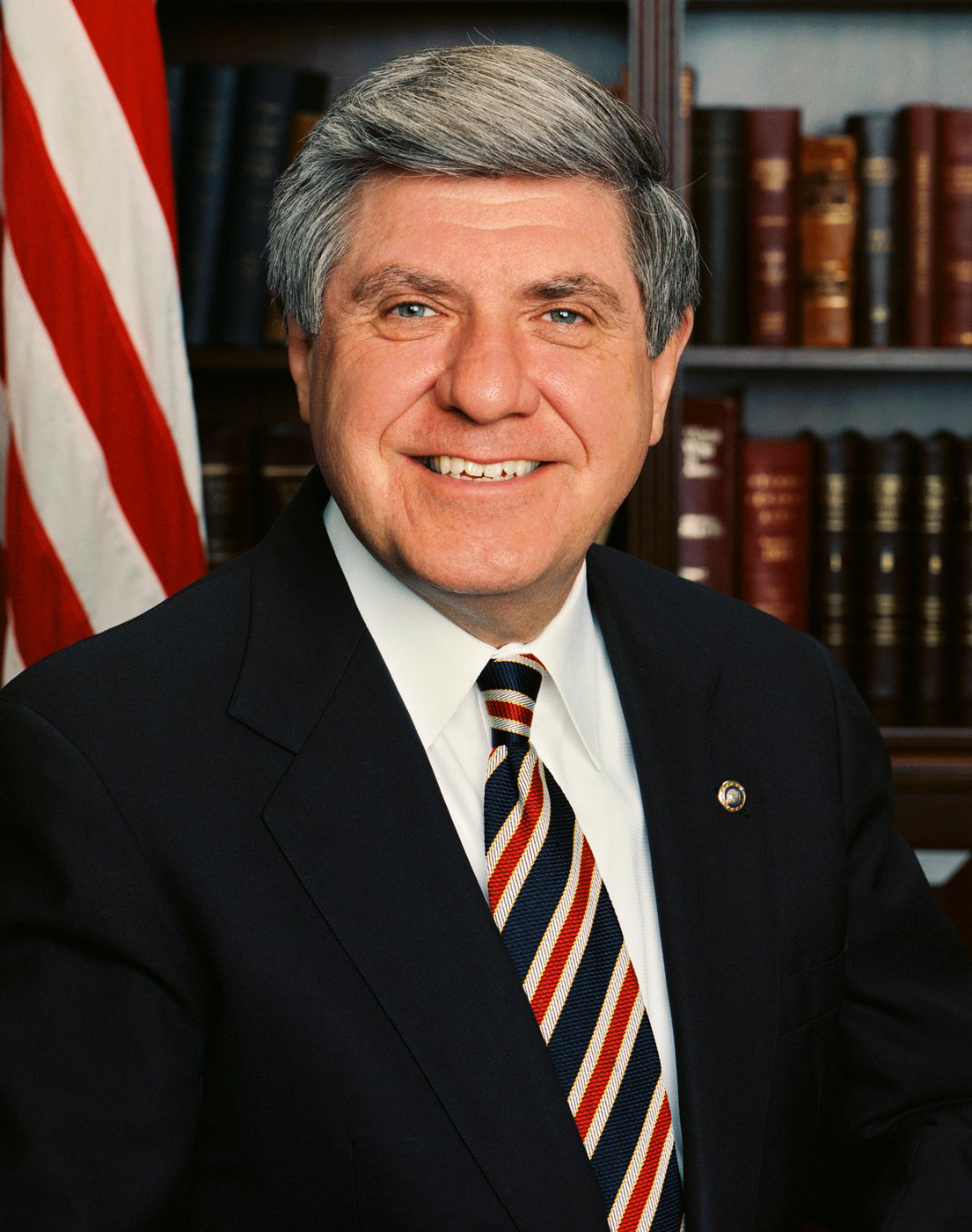
Ben Nelson, Nebraska

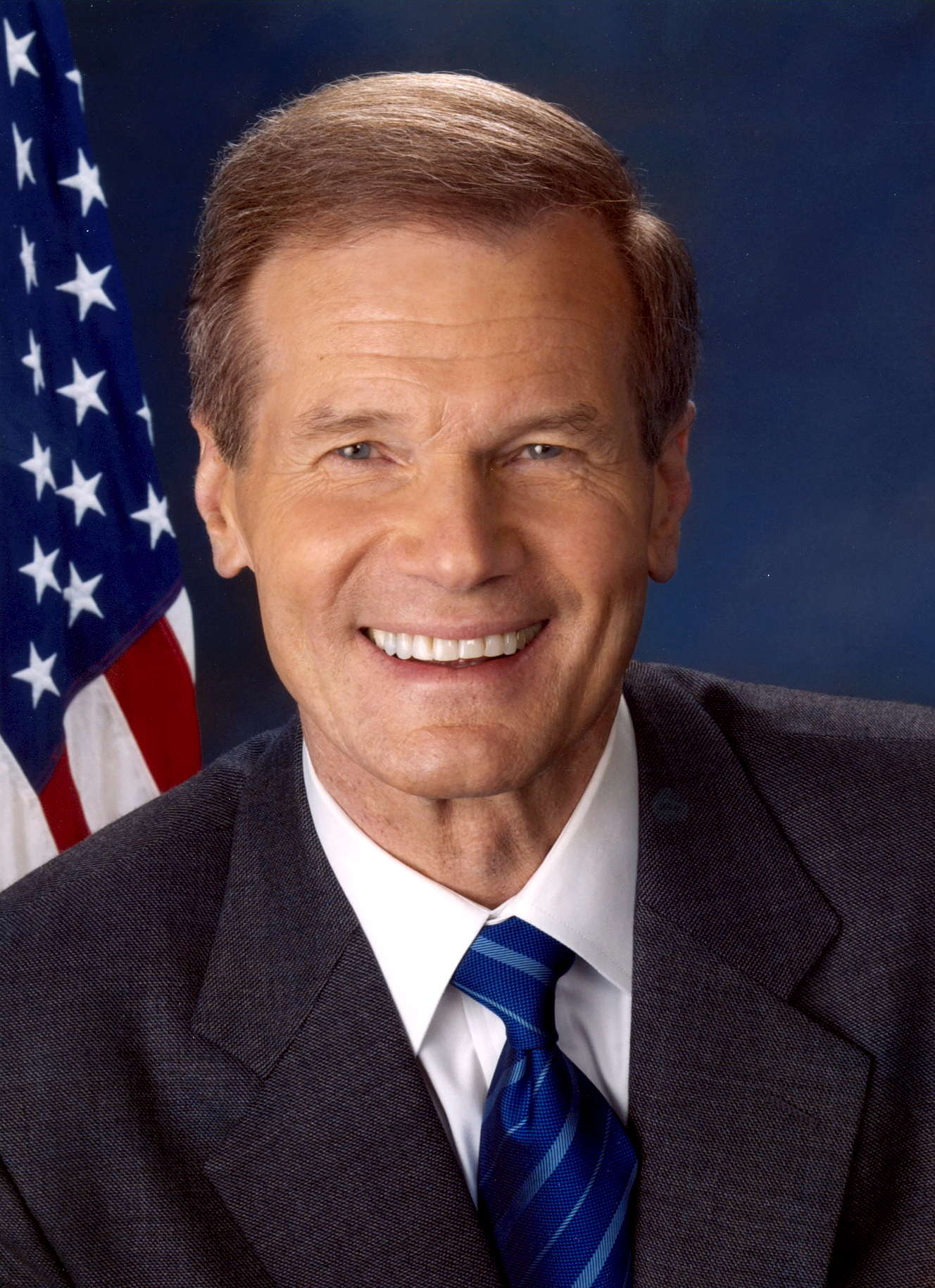
Bill Nelson, Florida

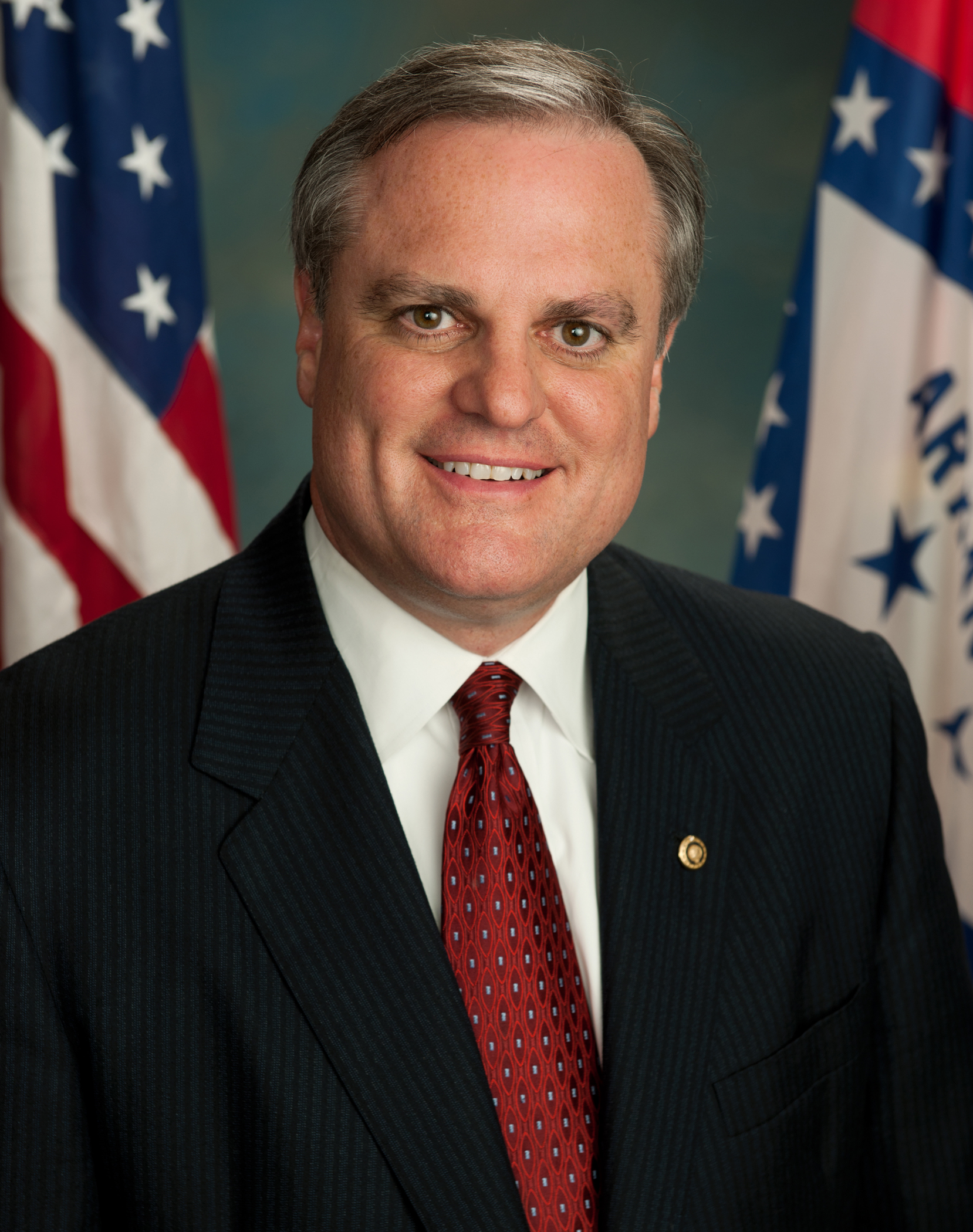
Mark Pryor, Arkansas

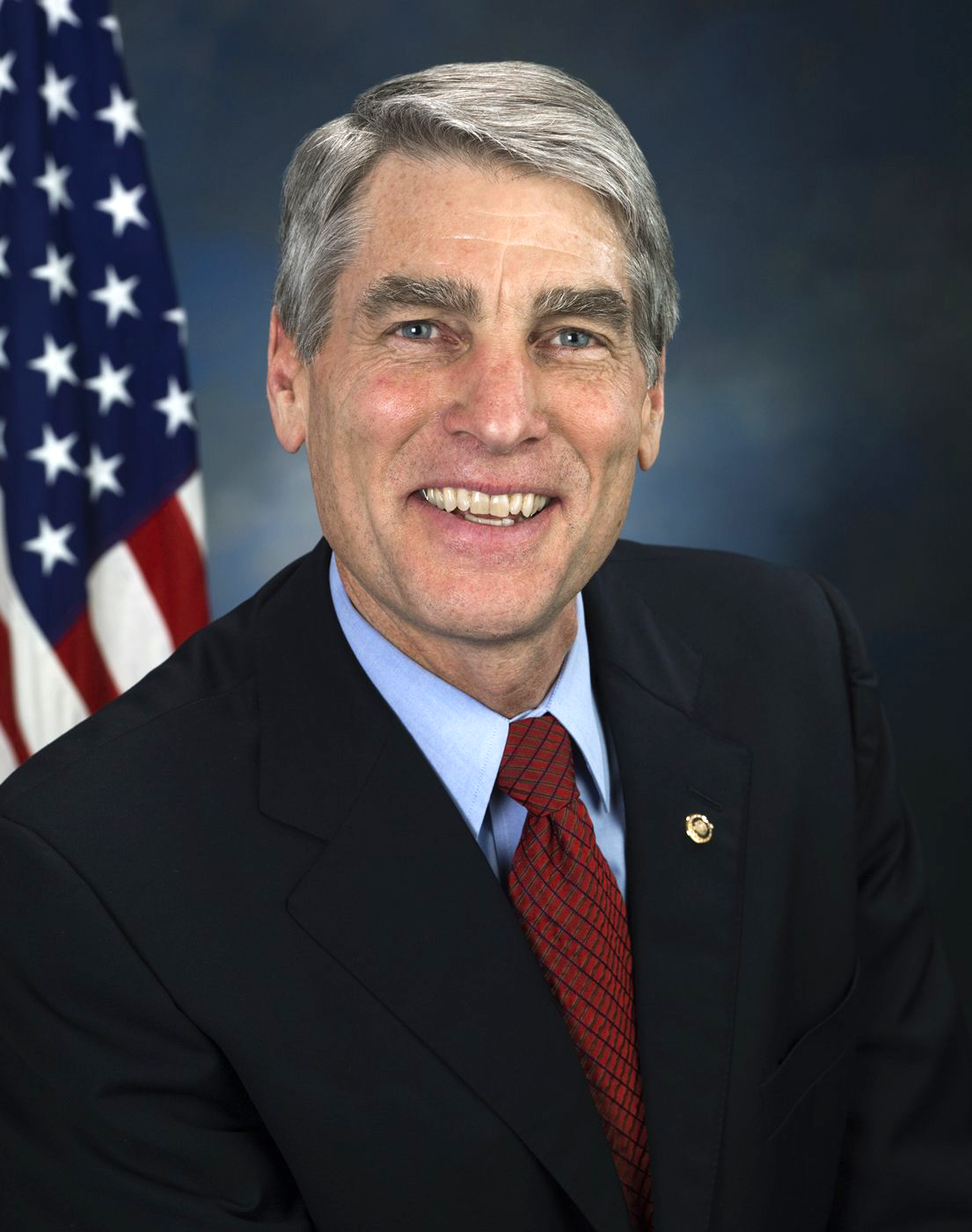
Mark Udall, Colorado

== See also ==
- New Democrat Coalition
- New Democrats
