= Reid Holiman =

American politician (1928–2016)

Member of the Arkansas Senate from the 33rd district
- In office January 11, 1993 – January 9, 1995
- Preceded by: William D. Moore Jr.
- Succeeded by: Fay Boozman

Personal details
- Born: Billy Reid Holiman; February 11, 1928 Sheridan, Arkansas, U.S.
- Died: May 18, 2016 (aged 88) Springdale, Arkansas, U.S.
- Party: Democratic
- Spouse: Jackie Jordan (m. 1950)
- Education: College of the Ozarks (BS); University of Arkansas (PharmD)

Military service
- Branch/service: United States Navy
- Battles/wars: World War II; American theater

Billy Reid Holiman (February 11, 1928 – May 18, 2016) was an American pharmacist and politician. A Democrat, he served two years as a member of the Arkansas Senate before being defeated for reelection by Fay Boozman in 1994. He was named Arkansas Pharmacist of the Year in 1978 and 1985.
