= Fay Boozman =

American ophthalmologist

Director of the Arkansas Department of Health
- In office February 1999 – March 19, 2005
- Governor: Mike Huckabee
- Preceded by: Sandra Nichols
- Succeeded by: Paul Halverson

Member of the Arkansas Senate from the 33rd district
- In office January 9, 1995 – January 11, 1999
- Preceded by: Reid Holiman
- Succeeded by: Dave Bisbee

Personal details
- Born: Fay Winford Boozman III; November 10, 1946 Fort Smith, Arkansas, U.S.
- Died: March 19, 2005 (aged 58) Rogers, Arkansas, U.S.
- Party: Republican
- Spouse: Vickey Manchaca
- Relations: John Boozman (brother)
- Children: 3
- Education: University of Arkansas (MD); Tulane University (MPH)

Military service
- Branch/service: United States Air Force
- Years of service: 1971–1979
- Rank: Major
- Unit: Arkansas Air National Guard
- Battles/wars: Vietnam War

Fay Winford Boozman III (November 10, 1946 – March 19, 2005) was an American ophthalmologist and politician who served as a member of the Arkansas Senate from 1995 to 1999.

Boozman was born in 1946, the son of Marie Nicholas and U.S. Air Force master sergeant Fay Winford Boozman Jr. He attended Tulane University, Hendrix College and the University of Arkansas for Medical Sciences, receiving a degree in ophthalmology.

Boozman and his brother John founded an eye clinic. He was married to Vickey and had three children. He served in the Arkansas Air National Guard from 1971 to 1977, becoming a major in February 1977 and serving in the Vietnam War.

He was elected to the Arkansas Senate in 1994 from the 33rd district.

Boozman was Arkansas' Republican nominee for U.S. Senate in 1998. During the campaign, Boozman caused controversy with his comments about rape, claiming that women rarely became pregnant after being raped due to a hormone he described as "God's little protective shield". He ultimately lost to Representative Blanche Lincoln by 13 points. His younger brother, John, would go on to defeat Lincoln to win the Senate seat in 2010. In 1999, Boozman was named director of the Arkansas Department of Health by Mike Huckabee, a post he held until his death in 2005.

Boozman died on March 19, 2005, following an accident at his farm in Rogers. Local officials say he was working alone in his barn when part of the structure collapsed, causing his death. After this, the College of Public Health at the University of Arkansas for Medical Science, from which he graduated, was renamed after him.

Party political offices
Preceded by Mike Huckabee	Republican Party nominee for United States Senator from Arkansas (Class 3); 1998	Succeeded by Jim Holt
