= 2014 United States Senate election in Arkansas =

- November 4, 2014
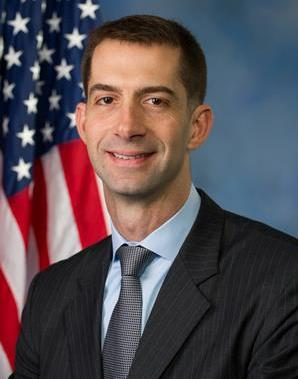

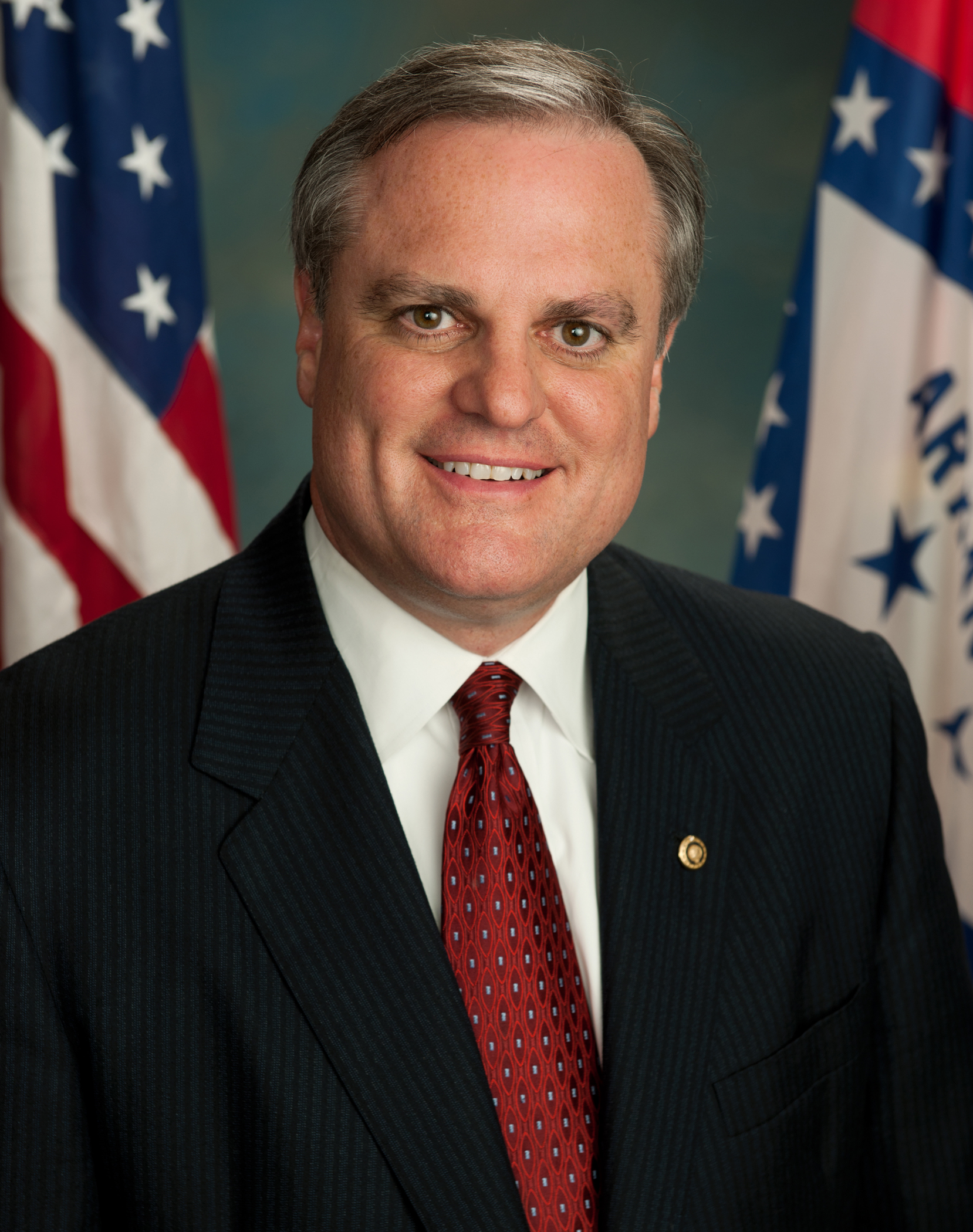
Nominee	Tom Cotton	Mark Pryor
Party	Republican	Democratic
Popular vote	478,819	334,174
Percentage	56.50%	39.43%
- Cotton: 40–50% 50–60% 60–70% 70–80% Pryor: 50–60% 60–70%
U.S. senator before election
Mark Pryor
Democratic
Elected U.S. Senator
Tom Cotton
Republican

The 2014 United States Senate election in Arkansas was held on November 4, 2014, to elect a member of the United States Senate to represent the state of Arkansas, concurrently with the election of the Governor of Arkansas, other elections to the United States Senate in other states, elections to the United States House of Representatives, and various state and local elections.

This was one of the seven Democratic-held Senate seats up for election in a state that Mitt Romney won in the 2012 presidential election. After facing only Green Party opposition in 2008, incumbent Democratic Senator Mark Pryor sought re-election to a third term in 2014. He was unopposed in the Democratic primary; U.S. Representative Tom Cotton was also unopposed for the Republican nomination. While the race was initially expected to be close, Cotton prevailed by a margin of 56% to 39%. The Associated Press called the race for Cotton immediately after the polls closed. Cotton's margin exceeded almost all published opinion polling; for most of the cycle, it was seen as one of the most competitive races in the nation.

This is the last time a senator from Arkansas lost re-election. Since Cotton took office in 2015, Republicans have held both of Arkansas' Senate seats and the state's entire congressional delegation, both of which had not happened since 1877. Pryor drew many comparisons to Blanche Lincoln, also a Democratic senator from Arkansas who was ultimately unseated in 2010, with Pryor having a similar fate.

Elected at age 37, Cotton surpassed Connecticut's Chris Murphy as the youngest incumbent senator at that time and remained so until the seating of Missouri’s Josh Hawley at the opening of the 116th United States Congress.

== Background ==
Arkansas Attorney General Mark Pryor was first elected to the Senate in 2002, defeating first-term Republican incumbent Tim Hutchinson. He was re-elected with 80% of the vote in 2008 as he was unopposed by a Republican candidate. He faced competition only from Green Party nominee Rebekah Kennedy, who won the largest share of the vote of any Green Party candidate in a Senate race in history. Of the 88 previous occasions when an incumbent senator was re-elected without major party opposition and then went on to contest the following general election, all 88 were re-elected.

Heading into the 2014 Cotton vs. Pryor matchup, only 17 House freshmen had been elected to the U.S. Senate over the last century, and just two in the last 40 years. In the 2014 cycle, Cotton and Montana's Steve Daines became the 18th and 19th freshmen to win U.S. Senate races since 1914.

The election was originally thought to be extremely close, which was backed up by polling. Tom Cotton ended up winning in a landslide against the incumbent, by 17.1 points. Cotton's victory, along with other Republican victories in other statewide elections, solidified the state's shift towards the GOP.

== Democratic primary ==
=== Candidates ===
==== Nominee ====
- Mark Pryor, incumbent U.S. senator

==== Declined ====
- Bobby Tullis, former state representative

=== Results ===
Democratic primary results
Party	Candidate	Votes	%
Democratic	Mark Pryor (incumbent)	Unopposed	
Total votes		—N/a	100.0

== Republican primary ==
Cotton was unopposed for the Republican nomination.

=== Candidates ===
==== Nominee ====
- Tom Cotton, U.S. representative for Arkansas's 4th congressional district (2013–2015)

==== Declined ====
- Rick Crawford, U.S. representative for Arkansas's 1st congressional district (2011–present) (running for re-election)
- Mark Darr, lieutenant governor of Arkansas (2011–2014)
- Timothy Griffin, U.S. representative for Arkansas's 2nd congressional district (2011–2015) (running for lieutenant governor)
- Steve Womack, U.S. representative Arkansas's 3rd congressional district (2011–present) (running for re-election)

=== Results ===
Republican primary results
Party	Candidate	Votes	%
Republican	Tom Cotton	Unopposed	
Total votes		—N/a	100.0

== Third parties ==
=== Candidates ===
==== Declared ====
- Nathan LaFrance (Libertarian), energy executive
- Mark Swaney (Green), mechanical engineer and nominee for the state house in 2010

== General election ==
=== Endorsements ===
Tom Cotton (R)

Individuals

- Tim Griffin, U.S. representative
- Mitt Romney, former governor of Massachusetts and 2012 Republican presidential candidate
- Marco Rubio, U.S. senator
- Rick Santorum, former U.S. senator from Pennsylvania and candidate for president of the United States in 2012
- Allen West, former U.S. representative
- Steve Womack, U.S. representative

Organizations

- Club for Growth
Mark Pryor (D)

Individuals

- Bill Clinton, 42nd president of the United States

Organizations

- Arkansas Education Association

=== Fundraising ===
Candidate	Raised	Spent	Cash on Hand
Mark Pryor (D)	$10,428,246	$12,034,784	$364,653
Tom Cotton (R)	$7,557,443	$6,411,763	$1,885,435

=== Debates ===
- Complete video of debate, October 13, 2014

=== Predictions ===
Source	Ranking	As of
The Cook Political Report	Tossup	November 3, 2014
Sabato's Crystal Ball	Likely R (flip)	November 3, 2014
Rothenberg Political Report	Lean R (flip)	November 3, 2014
Real Clear Politics	Lean R (flip)	November 3, 2014

=== Polling ===
Poll source	Date(s) administered	Sample size	Margin of error	Mark Pryor (D)	Tom Cotton (R)	Other	Undecided
Basswood Research	March 16–17, 2013	600	± 4%	35%	43%	—	22%
Basswood Research	June 22–23, 2013	600	± 4%	41%	40%	—	19%
Clark Research	July 23–27, 2013	729	± 4%	43%	35%	—	21%
On Message Inc.	July 29–30, 2013	600	± 4%	42%	44%	—	14%
Harper Polling	August 4–5, 2013	587	± 4.04%	41%	43%	—	16%
Global Strategy Group	August 26–29, 2013	501	± ?%	47%	40%	—	13%
Harper Polling	September 24–26, 2013	622	± 3.93%	45%	42%	—	13%
Talk Business/Hendrix College	October 8, 2013	603	± 4%	42%	41%	—	17%
Public Policy Polling	October 14–15, 2013	955	± 3.2%	44%	41%	—	15%
University of Arkansas	October 10–17, 2013	800	± 3.5%	34%	32%	—	34%
Impact Management Group	October 24, 2013	911	± 3.2%	41%	42%	—	18%
Polling Company/WomanTrend	December 6–7, 2013	400	± 4.9%	41%	48%	—	9%
Public Policy Polling	December 13–15, 2013	1,004	± 3.1%	44%	44%	—	12%
Rasmussen Reports	February 4–5, 2014	500	± 4.5%	40%	45%	5%	10%
Harper Polling	January 26–27, 2014	533	± 4.24%	36%	42%	—	22%
Impact Management Group	February 10, 2014	1,202	± 2.83%	42%	46%	—	13%
Hickman Analytics	February 17–20, 2014	400	± 4.9%	39%	41%	8%	12%
Hickman Analytics	February 17–20, 2014	400	± 4.9%	42%	51%	—	8%
Anzalone Liszt Grove Research	March 27 – April 2, 2014	600	± 4%	48%	45%	—	7%
Talk Business/Hendrix College	April 3–4, 2014	1,068	± 3%	46%	43%	4%	8%
Opinion Research Associates	April 1–8, 2014	400	± 5%	48%	38%	—	8%
Harper Polling	April 9–10, 2014	522	± 4.29%	39%	39%	—	22%
New York Times/Kaiser Family	April 8–15, 2014	857	± 4%	46%	36%	4%	15%
Magellan Strategies	April 14–15, 2014	857	± 3.35%	43%	46%	4%	7%
Public Policy Polling	April 25–27, 2014	840	± 3.4%	43%	42%	—	16%
NBC News/Marist	April 30 – May 4, 2014	876	± 3.3%	51%	40%	1%	3%
Rasmussen Reports	May 27–28, 2014	750	± 4%	43%	47%	4%	6%
Public Opinion Strategies	May 27–29, 2014	500	± 4.39%	41%	46%	—	13%
Fabrizio Lee	June 3–5, 2014	600	± 4%	43%	51%	—	5%
Magellan Strategies	June 4–5, 2014	755	± 3.57%	45%	49%	2%	4%
Impact Management Group	June 29, 2014	1290	± 2.72%	43%	47%	—	10%
Gravis Marketing	July 7–8, 2014	987	± 3%	44%	51%	5%	—
CBS News/NYT/YouGov	July 5–24, 2014	1,628	± 2.9%	45%	49%	1%	5%
Anzalone Liszt Grove Research	July 20–24, 2014	600	± 4%	48%	46%	—	6%
Talk Business/Hendrix College	July 22–25, 2014	1,780	± 2.3%	42%	44%	7%	7%
Public Policy Polling	August 1–3, 2014	1,066	± 3%	39%	41%	7%	14%
Public Policy Polling	August 1–3, 2014	1,066	± 3%	41%	43%	—	16%
Opinion Research Associates	August 6–14, 2014	414	± 4.9%	46%	41%	4%	9%
Rasmussen Reports	August 25–26, 2014	750	± 4%	44%	43%	6%	6%
ccAdvertising	August 31 – September 1, 2014	1,735	± ?	29%	37%	—	34%
CBS News/NYT/YouGov	August 18 – September 2, 2014	1,572	± 3%	39%	43%	2%	16%
CNN/ORC International	August 28 – September 2, 2014	523 LV	± 4.5%	47%	49%	—	4%
CNN/ORC International	August 28 – September 2, 2014	839 RV	± 3.5%	47%	38%	—	14%
Hickman Analytics	August 26 – September 3, 2014	700	± 3.7%	45%	43%	—	12%
NBC News/Marist	September 2–4, 2014	639 LV	± 3.9%	40%	45%	6%	9%
NBC News/Marist	September 2–4, 2014	1,068 RV	± 3%	41%	41%	8%	11%
Answers Unlimited	September 7–9, 2014	600	± 3.5%	46%	42%	4%	8%
Gravis Marketing	September 8–11, 2014	902	± 4%	43%	47%	2%	8%
Hickman Analytics	September 13–18, 2014	801	± 3.5%	46%	43%	—	11%
Public Policy Polling	September 18–21, 2014	1,453	± 2.6%	38%	43%	6%	13%
Public Policy Polling	September 18–21, 2014	1,453	± 2.6%	39%	45%	—	15%
Suffolk	September 20–23, 2014	500	± 4.4%	45%	43%	5%	7%
Rasmussen Reports	September 24–25, 2014	750	± 4%	40%	47%	5%	8%
CBS News/NYT/YouGov	September 20 – October 1, 2014	1,991	± 2%	41%	45%	1%	13%
Opinion Research Associates	October 1–5, 2014	400	± 5%	45%	42%	5%	9%
Fox News	October 4–7, 2014	707	± 3.5%	39%	46%	5%	11%
Rasmussen Reports	October 13–15, 2014	940	± 3%	44%	47%	4%	5%
Talk Business/Hendrix	October 15–16, 2014	2,075	± 2.2%	40.5%	49%	5%	6%
NBC News/Marist	October 19–23, 2014	621	± 3.9%	43%	45%	6%	7%
NBC News/Marist	October 19–23, 2014	971	± 3.1%	43%	42%	6%	9%
CBS News/NYT/YouGov	October 16–23, 2014	1,567	± 4%	42%	47%	1%	10%
Opinion Research Associates	October 25–26, 2014	401	± 5%	45%	44%	2%	10%
Issues & Answers Network	October 21–27, 2014	568	± 4.1%	36%	49%	—	15%
Rasmussen Reports	October 27–29, 2014	967	± 3%	44%	51%	4%	2%
Public Policy Polling	October 30 – November 1, 2014	1,092	± 3%	41%	49%	4%	5%
Public Policy Polling	October 30 – November 1, 2014	1,092	± 3%	45%	51%	—	4%
Opinion Research Associates	October 30 – November 1, 2014	400	± 5%	45%	43%	4%	8%

=== Results ===
2014 United States Senate election in Arkansas
Party	Candidate	Votes	%
Republican	Tom Cotton	478,819	56.50%
Democratic	Mark Pryor (incumbent)	334,174	39.43%
Libertarian	Nathan LaFrance	17,210	2.03%
Green	Mark Swaney	16,797	1.98%
Write-in		505	0.06%
Total votes		847,505	100.00%
Republican gain from Democratic			

==== By county ====
County	Mark Pryor Democratic		Tom Cotton Republican		Various candidates Other parties		Margin		Total
County	#	%	#	%	#	%	#	%	Total
Arkansas	2,358	46.35%	2,590	50.91%	139	2.73%	232	4.56%	5,087
Ashley	2,775	44.61%	3,267	52.52%	179	2.88%	492	7.91%	6,221
Baxter	4,364	29.16%	9,950	66.48%	654	4.37%	5,586	37.32%	14,968
Benton	17,511	27.83%	42,358	67.32%	3,056	4.86%	24,847	39.49%	62,925
Boone	2,884	26.21%	7,578	68.88%	540	4.91%	4,694	42.66%	11,002
Bradley	1,323	45.79%	1,469	50.85%	97	3.36%	146	5.05%	2,889
Calhoun	664	40.64%	898	54.96%	72	4.41%	234	14.32%	1,634
Carroll	2,985	36.95%	4,698	58.16%	395	4.89%	1,713	21.21%	8,078
Chicot	2,284	65.26%	1,149	32.83%	67	1.91%	-1,135	-32.43%	3,500
Clark	3,625	52.09%	3,122	44.86%	212	3.05%	-503	-7.23%	6,959
Clay	1,573	39.34%	2,253	56.35%	172	4.30%	680	17.01%	3,998
Cleburne	2,686	27.20%	6,636	67.21%	552	5.59%	3,950	40.00%	9,874
Cleveland	939	34.47%	1,668	61.23%	117	4.30%	729	26.76%	2,724
Columbia	3,094	39.03%	4,610	58.15%	224	2.83%	1,516	19.12%	7,928
Conway	2,703	42.60%	3,393	53.48%	249	3.92%	690	10.87%	6,345
Craighead	9,055	35.77%	15,247	60.24%	1,009	3.99%	6,192	24.46%	25,311
Crawford	4,242	26.17%	11,134	68.70%	831	5.13%	6,892	42.52%	16,207
Crittenden	5,901	55.25%	4,527	42.38%	253	2.37%	-1,374	-12.86%	10,681
Cross	2,143	40.65%	2,982	56.56%	147	2.79%	839	15.91%	5,272
Dallas	1,134	47.89%	1,166	49.24%	68	2.87%	32	1.35%	2,368
Desha	2,082	61.27%	1,211	35.64%	105	3.09%	-871	-25.63%	3,398
Drew	2,378	45.54%	2,675	51.23%	169	3.24%	297	5.69%	5,222
Faulkner	11,885	35.07%	20,588	60.74%	1,420	4.19%	8,703	25.68%	33,893
Franklin	1,854	33.85%	3,357	61.29%	266	4.86%	1,503	27.44%	5,477
Fulton	1,234	36.48%	2,005	59.27%	144	4.26%	771	22.79%	3,383
Garland	11,126	36.05%	18,567	60.15%	1,173	3.80%	7,441	24.11%	30,866
Grant	1,615	30.23%	3,490	65.32%	238	4.45%	1,875	35.09%	5,343
Greene	3,675	33.11%	6,865	61.85%	559	5.04%	3,190	28.74%	11,099
Hempstead	2,140	39.81%	3,080	57.30%	155	2.88%	940	17.49%	5,375
Hot Spring	3,661	38.97%	5,260	55.99%	473	5.04%	1,599	17.02%	9,394
Howard	1,485	40.57%	2,082	56.89%	93	2.54%	597	16.31%	3,660
Independence	3,407	32.09%	6,615	62.30%	596	5.61%	3,208	30.21%	10,618
Izard	1,550	35.62%	2,595	59.64%	206	4.73%	1,045	24.02%	4,351
Jackson	1,808	43.63%	2,103	50.75%	233	5.62%	295	7.12%	4,144
Jefferson	13,145	65.26%	6,568	32.61%	431	2.14%	-6,577	-32.65%	20,144
Johnson	2,488	38.05%	3,638	55.64%	413	6.32%	1,150	17.59%	6,539
Lafayette	973	40.46%	1,367	56.84%	65	2.70%	394	16.38%	2,405
Lawrence	1,731	37.81%	2,593	56.64%	254	5.55%	862	18.83%	4,578
Lee	1,737	65.18%	871	32.68%	57	2.14%	-866	-32.50%	2,665
Lincoln	1,427	46.35%	1,538	49.95%	114	3.70%	111	3.61%	3,079
Little River	1,620	39.80%	2,295	56.39%	155	3.81%	675	16.58%	4,070
Logan	2,132	32.96%	3,932	60.79%	404	6.25%	1,800	27.83%	6,468
Lonoke	5,368	27.52%	13,330	68.33%	809	4.15%	7,962	40.82%	19,507
Madison	1,755	34.02%	3,102	60.13%	302	5.85%	1,347	26.11%	5,159
Marion	1,428	28.41%	3,328	66.20%	271	5.39%	1,900	37.80%	5,027
Miller	3,636	31.74%	7,581	66.19%	237	2.07%	3,945	34.44%	11,454
Mississippi	5,349	51.84%	4,523	43.84%	446	4.32%	-826	-8.01%	10,318
Monroe	1,292	53.81%	1,025	42.69%	84	3.50%	-267	-11.12%	2,401
Montgomery	940	32.41%	1,834	63.24%	126	4.34%	894	30.83%	2,900
Nevada	1,280	46.48%	1,405	51.02%	69	2.51%	125	4.54%	2,754
Newton	908	30.53%	1,923	64.66%	143	4.81%	1,015	34.13%	2,974
Ouachita	3,999	50.30%	3,748	47.14%	204	2.57%	-251	-3.16%	7,951
Perry	1,258	35.07%	2,108	58.77%	221	6.16%	850	23.70%	3,587
Phillips	3,792	65.71%	1,774	30.74%	205	3.55%	-2,018	-34.97%	5,771
Pike	971	31.30%	2,015	64.96%	116	3.74%	1,044	33.66%	3,102
Poinsett	2,336	36.78%	3,689	58.08%	327	5.15%	1,353	21.30%	6,352
Polk	1,511	23.82%	4,446	70.08%	387	6.10%	2,935	46.26%	6,344
Pope	4,687	27.42%	11,611	67.93%	794	4.65%	6,924	40.51%	17,092
Prairie	998	37.55%	1,539	57.90%	121	4.55%	541	20.35%	2,658
Pulaski	71,905	56.35%	52,142	40.86%	3,560	2.79%	-19,763	-15.49%	127,607
Randolph	1,842	36.41%	2,951	58.33%	266	5.26%	1,109	21.92%	5,059
Saline	12,153	30.65%	25,756	64.96%	1,738	4.38%	13,603	34.31%	39,647
Scott	925	30.00%	1,964	63.70%	194	6.29%	1,039	33.70%	3,083
Searcy	755	24.71%	2,144	70.18%	156	5.11%	1,389	45.47%	3,055
Sebastian	9,870	30.98%	20,573	64.58%	1,413	4.44%	10,703	33.60%	31,856
Sevier	1,176	33.16%	2,243	63.25%	127	3.58%	1,067	30.09%	3,546
Sharp	1,788	31.69%	3,534	62.63%	321	5.69%	1,746	30.94%	5,643
St. Francis	3,752	62.05%	2,198	36.35%	97	1.60%	-1,554	-25.70%	6,047
Stone	1,478	32.75%	2,805	62.15%	230	5.10%	1,327	29.40%	4,513
Union	4,818	38.91%	7,253	58.58%	310	2.50%	2,435	19.67%	12,381
Van Buren	1,957	33.14%	3,648	61.78%	300	5.08%	1,691	28.64%	5,905
Washington	22,285	40.92%	29,454	54.08%	2,724	5.00%	7,169	13.16%	54,463
White	5,507	25.21%	15,296	70.02%	1,043	4.77%	9,789	44.81%	21,846
Woodruff	1,299	60.39%	749	34.82%	103	4.79%	-550	-25.57%	2,151
Yell	1,760	33.78%	3,138	60.23%	312	5.99%	1,378	26.45%	5,210
Totals	334,174	39.43%	478,819	56.50%	34,512	4.07%	144,645	17.07%	847,505

==== By congressional district ====
Cotton won all four congressional districts.

District	Pryor	Cotton	Representative
1st	40%	56%	Rick Crawford
2nd	45%	51%	French Hill
3rd	32%	63%	Steve Womack
4th	40%	56%	Bruce Westerman

== See also ==
- 2014 Arkansas gubernatorial election
- 2014 United States House of Representatives elections in Arkansas
- 2014 United States Senate elections
- 2014 United States elections
