= Mark Pryor =

American attorney & politician (born 1963)

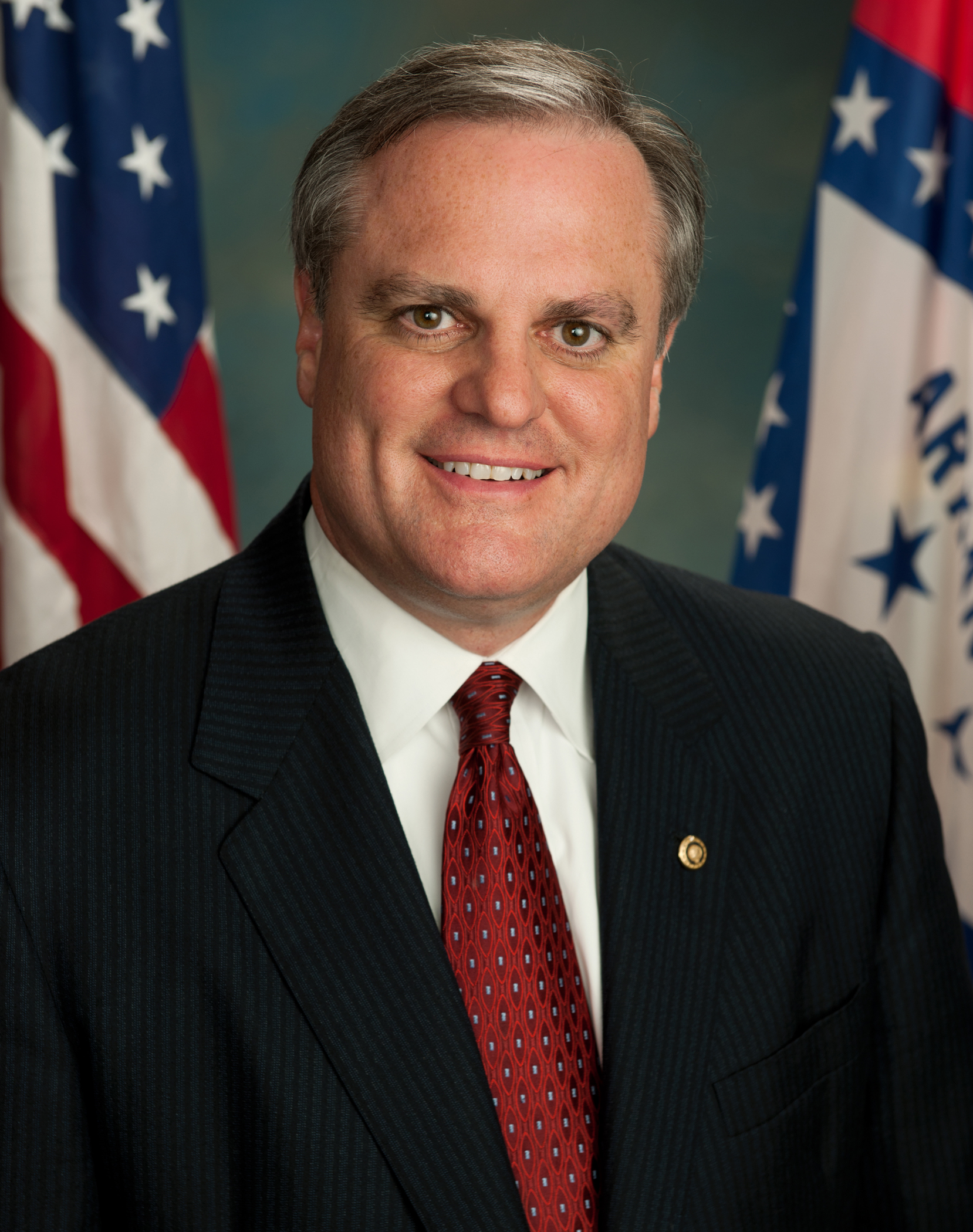
- Official portrait, 2011

United States Senator from Arkansas
- In office January 3, 2003 – January 3, 2015
- Preceded by: Tim Hutchinson
- Succeeded by: Tom Cotton

53rd Attorney General of Arkansas
- In office January 12, 1999 – January 3, 2003
- Governor: Mike Huckabee
- Preceded by: Winston Bryant
- Succeeded by: Mike Beebe

Member of the Arkansas House of Representatives
- In office January 14, 1991 – January 9, 1995
- Preceded by: Gloria Cabe
- Succeeded by: Lisa Ferrell
- Constituency: 59th district (1991–1993); 57th district (1993–1995)

Personal details
- Born: Mark Lunsford Pryor; January 10, 1963 (age 63) Fayetteville, Arkansas, U.S.
- Party: Democratic
- Spouse: Joi Pryor
- Children: 2
- Parent: David Pryor (father)
- Education: University of Arkansas (BA, JD)
- Website: Official website
- Pryor's voice Pryor testifying on toy safety at a Senate Appropriations Committee hearing. Recorded September 12, 2007

Mark Lunsford Pryor (born January 10, 1963) is an American attorney, politician and lobbyist who served as a United States senator from Arkansas from 2003 to 2015. A member of the Democratic Party, he previously served as attorney general of Arkansas from 1999 to 2003 and in the Arkansas House of Representatives from 1991 to 1995.

Born in Fayetteville, Arkansas, Pryor is the son of former Arkansas Governor and U.S. Senator David Pryor. He received his bachelor's degree from University of Arkansas at Fayetteville and his J.D. degree from its law school. He worked in private practice for several years until being elected to the Arkansas House of Representatives in 1990. He was elected the state attorney general in 1998. Pryor announced his candidacy for the U.S. Senate in 2001, running for the same Senate seat his father had held from 1979 to 1997. He was elected with 54% of the vote, defeating Republican incumbent Tim Hutchinson.

He was reelected with no Republican opposition in 2008. During the 112th Congress he served as the chairman of the Commerce Subcommittee on Consumer Protection, Product Safety, and Insurance. Pryor ran for reelection in 2014, but was defeated by Republican Tom Cotton. In 2020, Pryor was hired as a lobbyist by Brownstein Hyatt Farber Schreck. He is the most recent Democrat to serve in the U.S. Senate from Arkansas.

== Early life and education ==
Pryor was born on January 10, 1963, in Fayetteville, Arkansas, to the future state First Lady Barbara Jean (Lunsford) and future Governor and U.S. Senator David Hampton Pryor, then a state representative. He attended Little Rock Central High School until his father was elected to the United States Senate in 1979, after which he attended Walt Whitman High School in Maryland until graduating in 1981.

He graduated from the University of Arkansas in 1985 with a Bachelor of Arts degree in history and went on to receive his Juris Doctor from the university's law school in 1988. During his time in college, he was a member of the Sigma Alpha Epsilon fraternity.

== Early career ==
Prior to entering politics, Pryor worked as a private practice attorney focusing on civil litigation.

=== Arkansas House of Representatives ===
He was a member of the Arkansas House of Representatives from 1991 to 1995.

=== Arkansas Attorney General ===
In 1994, he ran for Arkansas Attorney General, challenging incumbent Winston Bryant in the Democratic primary. Pryor lost 58% to 42%. In 1998, he ran for the same position again after Bryant retired to run for the U.S. Senate, and became the Democratic Party nominee. He defeated Republican nominee Betty Dicky, the Redfield City Attorney, 59% to 41%. He won all but four counties in the state: Benton, Boone, Marion, and Baxter. He was also delegate to the Democratic National Convention in 2000.

== U.S. Senate ==
Pryor was recognized for providing a high level of constituent service, and he helped to secure millions of dollars in highway funds for the state. Pryor was also a committed advocate of the state’s military families; he guided the SACRIFICE Act to passage, thus providing families of those injured in combat more timely and reliable medical care.

=== Elections ===
==== 2002 ====
In late 2001, Pryor announced his candidacy for the Senate seat held by Tim Hutchinson, who six years earlier had become the first Arkansas Republican to serve in that body since Reconstruction. The seat had been held by his father David Pryor (also a former Arkansas governor), who actively campaigned for his son. Pryor defeated Hutchinson 54% to 46% and was the only Democratic candidate for the Senate to defeat a Republican incumbent in that election cycle.

==== 2008 ====
Pryor won reelection in 2008 without a Republican opponent. There had been speculation that former Governor Mike Huckabee would run against Pryor if his presidential bid was unsuccessful, but on March 8, Huckabee said he would not contest the race. The only Republican to express interest in the race, health care executive Tom Formicola, decided not to run. Pryor's only announced opponent was Green Party candidate Rebekah Kennedy, whom he defeated 80% to 20%.

==== 2014 ====
Pryor ran for reelection to a third term in 2014, against Republican U.S. House Rep. Tom Cotton.

In March 2014, during an MSNBC news segment regarding the Senate race, Pryor said that Cotton gave off a "sense of entitlement" to a seat in the Senate due to his service in the military. After receiving much criticism for the remark, Pryor later said he was not attacking Cotton’s military service, but his perceived lack of accomplishments in the House: "But the point remains that he's been in the House now for a little over a year, he hasn't passed any legislation. There's not one thing he's done for Arkansas."

FactCheck.org called two ads aired by Pryor's 2014 Senate campaign misleading in their criticisms of Paul Ryan's Medicare plan, supported by his opponent.

This race was originally thought to be close, but Pryor lost in a landslide, 57% to 39%. This was the worst performance in the nation for any incumbent Senator since the defeat of then-fellow Arkansas Senator Blanche Lincoln in 2010.

=== Tenure ===
Somewhat atypically, Pryor was the Baby of the Senate for 19 days in January 2009, at age 45, despite never having held that distinction in his first term. This was due to the defeat of the younger John E. Sununu, making Pryor the oldest member to ever be the youngest within the Senate until the appointment of Michael Bennet.

In June 2007, before the annual Arkansas Democratic Party Jefferson-Jackson dinner, Pryor announced his endorsement of his colleague Sen. Hillary Clinton for president of the United States.

In 2013, Pryor voted with President Obama 90% of the time.

Since 2009, Pryor's top three donors have been lawyers ($1,131,431), leadership PACs ($429,149), and lobbyists ($323,769).

=== Legislation sponsored ===
Pryor introduced the Drought Information Act of 2013 (S. 376; 113th Congress) on February 25, 2013. The bill that would authorize funding for the National Integrated Drought Information System (NIDIS) through 2018. The NIDIS is "charged with providing timely information to prevent drought and extreme weather damage." The bill passed the United States Senate on February 3, 2014.

Pryor introduced the bill "To repeal section 403 of the Bipartisan Budget Act of 2013" on January 27, 2014. The bill would repeal the provision of the Bipartisan Budget Act of 2013 that would reduce the amount of the annual cost of living increase to non-disabled military veterans under age 62. The Congressional Budget Office estimated that enacting Pryor's bill would stop the reduction of $6.813 billion from the amount paid to veterans annually.

=== Committee assignments ===
- Committee on Appropriations
  - Subcommittee on Agriculture, Rural Development, Food and Drug Administration, and Related Agencies (Chairman)
  - Subcommittee on Commerce, Justice, Science, and Related Agencies
  - Subcommittee on Defense
  - Subcommittee on Labor, Health and Human Services, Education, and Related Agencies
  - Subcommittee on Military Construction, Veterans Affairs, and Related Agencies
  - Subcommittee on Transportation, Housing and Urban Development, and Related Agencies
- Committee on Commerce, Science, Transportation
  - Subcommittee on Aviation Operations, Safety, and Security
  - Subcommittee on Consumer Affairs, Insurance, and Automotive Safety (Chairman)
  - Subcommittee on Competitiveness, Innovation, and Export Promotion
  - Subcommittee on Science and Space
  - Subcommittee on Surface Transportation and Merchant Marine Infrastructure, Safety, and Security
- Committee on Homeland Security and Governmental Affairs
  - Subcommittee on Emergency Management, Intergovernmental Relations, and the District of Columbia
  - Subcommittee on the Efficiency and Effectiveness of Federal Programs and the Federal Workforce
  - Subcommittee on Financial and Contracting Oversight
  - Permanent Subcommittee on Investigations
- Committee on Armed Services
  - Subcommittee on Airland
  - Subcommittee on Readiness and Management Support
  - Subcommittee on Personnel
  - Subcommittee on Strategic Forces
- Committee on Rules and Administration
- Committee on Small Business and Entrepreneurship
- Select Committee on Ethics

== Political positions ==
=== Fiscal policy ===
On February 13, 2009, Pryor voted to pass the American Recovery and Reinvestment Act of 2009.

On April 16, 2012, Pryor was the only Democratic senator to vote against the "Buffett Rule," which was defeated 51 voting in favor to 45 voting against cloture of the filibuster.

In April 2014, the United States Senate debated the Minimum Wage Fairness Act (S. 1737; 113th Congress). The bill would amend the Fair Labor Standards Act of 1938 (FLSA) to increase the federal minimum wage for employees to $10.10 per hour over the course of a two-year period. The bill was strongly supported by President Barack Obama and many of the Democratic Senators, but strongly opposed by Republicans in the Senate and House. Pryor opposed the bill. Pryor was up for election in 2014 and was at that time considered "the Senate's most vulnerable incumbent."

=== Agriculture ===
Senator Pryor was consistently opposed to proposed cuts to conservation, rural development, agriculture research, nutrition, and forestry programs. In 2014, as Chairman of the Subcommittee on Agriculture, Rural Development, Food and Drug Administration, and Related Agencies, he wrote the $20 billion annual spending legislation that allocates funds for agriculture programs. Pryor secured a legislation within the 2014 Farm bill to allow domestic forestry products to be recognized by USDA as biobased, ensuring such products can be used by the federal government and can be sold as a greener alternative to consumers.

Through the annual budget process, Pryor helped allocate more than $125 million to advance research in forestry, specialty crops, animal science, wetland management, aquaculture and weather management. Pryor also worked closely with Senator Boozman to advance agricultural and food law research by allowing institutions such as the National Agricultural Law Center to enter into partnerships with private industry.

=== Estate tax ===
In June 2006, Pryor voted against repeal of the federal estate tax. In 2013, Pryor and Senator John Boozman were credited by Arkansas Farm Bureau president Randy Veach for their opposition to President Obama's plan to raise the estate tax. Pryor co-sponsored a bill that would implement a one-year extension on current estate tax rates. The bill did not pass. In 2008 Pryor voted against expanding the pool of people exempt from the estate tax.

=== Health care ===
Pryor voted for the Affordable Care Act (Obamacare) in December 2009. He later voted against the Health Care and Education Reconciliation Act of 2010.

=== Foreign policy ===
Pryor opposed bringing Guantanamo Bay prisoners to the United States for trial.

On September 28, 2006, Pryor was one of 12 Democratic senators who voted to adopt S.3930, the Military Commissions Act of 2006. He voted against the flag burning amendment in June 2006.

On March 15, 2007, Pryor was one of two Democratic senators to have voted against a resolution aimed at withdrawing most American combat troops from Iraq in 2008. The vote, requiring 60 votes to pass, was 50 to 48 against.

=== Social policy ===
In 2003, Pryor voted for a federal ban on partial-birth abortion. He has voted in favor of the expansion of embryonic stem cell research. He voted against restricting UN funding for population control policies, prohibiting minors crossing state lines for abortion, and barring Health and Human Services grants to organizations that perform abortions.

On December 18, 2010, Pryor voted in favor of the Don't Ask, Don't Tell Repeal Act of 2010.

=== Gun policy ===
In 2004, Pryor voted to extend the Federal Assault Weapons Ban.

In 2013, Pryor voted against a measure that would have required background checks for all firearms purchases.

In March 2013, Pryor cosponsored a bill that would flag individuals attempting to buy guns who have used an insanity defense, were ruled dangerous by a court, or had been committed by a court to mental health treatment. It did not address the gun show loophole. The bill was not passed into law.

=== Judicial nominees ===
On May 23, 2005, Pryor was one of 14 senators who forged a compromise on the Democrats' use of the judicial filibuster. This effectively ended any threat of a Democratic filibuster (and thus also avoided the Republican leadership's threatened implementation of the so-called nuclear option). Under the agreement, the Democrats would exercise the power to filibuster a Bush judicial nominee only in an "extraordinary circumstance." The threat of a filibuster removed, Republicans were able to force cloture on the three most conservative Bush appellate court nominees (Janice Rogers Brown, Priscilla Owen and William Pryor-no close relation), who subsequently passed a vote by the full Republican-controlled Senate. He did, however, vote against the nomination of Samuel Alito to the U.S. Supreme Court.

On November 21, 2013, Pryor was one of only three Democratic senators to dissent from Harry Reid's leadership to vote against the nuclear option which switched the Senate away from operating on a supermajority basis, to requiring only a simple majority for certain decisions. In his speech on the Senate floor that day, he said that the Senate was, "a place for debate...where Members...can reach across the aisle and find solutions...Part of that is to allow the minority to speak, even if it is a minority of one. We need to protect that right, and we need to protect every Senator's right to debate and to amend legislation." He said that the Senate was, in a sense, "the only place where the minority is guaranteed a voice. They sometimes get outvoted, but they are guaranteed at least to be heard," and said that he was, "disappointed in the use of the nuclear option. I opposed that. I think it could do permanent damage to this institution and could have some very negative ramifications for our country and for the American people.".

== Post-Senate career ==
In March 2015, Pryor became a partner at D.C.-based law and lobbying firm Venable. During the 2016 and 2020 United States presidential election Pryor was a member of the Platform Committee for the Democratic National Convention.

In 2020, he was recruited by the law and lobbying firm Brownstein Hyatt Farber Schreck, and described the opportunity to work for the powerhouse firm as "kind of like being able to go play football at Clemson or Alabama." As of 2021, Pryor's clients include drugmaker Eli Lilly and Company, meat processor Tyson Foods, power and natural gas conglomerate Duke Energy, and auto manufacturer General Motors, among others.

In 2021, he wrote a piece for The New York Times that called for President Joe Biden to appoint an aggressive antitrust enforcer to lead the Department of Justice Antitrust Division. Pryor is a member of the Board of Advisors of the American Council for Capital Formation (ACCF).

== Personal life ==
Pryor lives in Little Rock and has a son and a daughter, Adams and Porter. He is married to Joi Pryor. They are members of the First Assembly of God in North Little Rock.

In 1996, Pryor was diagnosed with clear-cell sarcoma, a rare form of cancer, in his left leg. His treatment and rehabilitation took 15 months, and he was told by one doctor that he might have to have his leg amputated, but it was discovered early enough and the cancer was successfully removed.

== Electoral history ==
=== U.S. Senator ===
==== 2014 ====
United States Senate election in Arkansas, 2014
Party	Candidate	Votes	%	±%
Republican	Tom Cotton	478,819	56.50%	N/A
Democratic	Mark Pryor (incumbent)	334,174	39.43%	−40.10%
Libertarian	Nathan LaFrance	17,210	2.03%	N/A
Green	Mark Swaney	16,797	1.98%	−18.49%
N/A	Write-ins	505	0.06%	N/A
Total votes		'847,505'	'100.0%'	N/A
Republican gain from Democratic				

==== 2008 ====
United States Senate election in Arkansas, 2008
Party	Candidate	Votes	%
Democratic	Mark Pryor (incumbent)	804,678	79.53
Green	Rebekah Kennedy	207,076	20.47
Total votes		1,011,754	100.00
Invalid or blank votes		75,586	n/a
Democratic hold			

==== 2002 ====
Arkansas U.S. Senate Election 2002
Party	Candidate	Votes	%	±%
Democratic	Mark Pryor	433,306	53.9	
Republican	Tim Hutchinson (Incumbent)	370,653	46.1	

== See also ==
- Conservative Democrat

Party political offices
Preceded by Winston Bryant	Democratic nominee for Attorney General of Arkansas; 1998	Succeeded by Mike Beebe
Preceded by Winston Bryant	Democratic nominee for U.S. Senator from Arkansas (Class 2); 2002, 2008, 2014	Vacant Title next held by Hallie Shoffner; 2026
Legal offices
Preceded by Winston Bryant	Attorney General of Arkansas; 1999–2003	Succeeded by Mike Beebe
U.S. Senate
Preceded by Tim Hutchinson	U.S. Senator (Class 2) from Arkansas; 2003–2015; Served alongside: Blanche Lincoln, John Boozman	Succeeded by Tom Cotton
Honorary titles
Preceded by John Sununu	Baby of the Senate; 2009	Succeeded by Michael Bennet
U.S. order of precedence (ceremonial)
Preceded by Blanche Lincoln as Former U.S. Senator	Order of precedence of the United States as Former U.S. Senator	Succeeded by Connie Mack III as Former U.S. Senator
