= National Integrated Drought Information System Reauthorization Act of 2013 =

United States Congressional Bill

- Long title: To reauthorize the National Integrated Drought Information System.
- Announced in: the 113th United States Congress
- Sponsored by: Rep. Ralph M. Hall (R, TX-4)
- Number of co-sponsors: 2

Codification
- Acts affected: National Integrated Drought Information System Act of 2006
- U.S.C. sections affected: 15 U.S.C. § 313d
- Agencies affected: National Oceanic and Atmospheric Administration
- Authorizations of appropriations: $67,500,000 for each of fiscal years 2014, 2015, 2016, 2017 and 2018

Legislative history
- Introduced in the House as H.R. 2431 by Rep. Ralph M. Hall (R, TX-4) on June 19, 2013; Committee consideration by United States House Committee on Science, Space and Technology, United States House Science Subcommittee on Environment; Passed the House on February 10, 2014 (Roll Call Vote 55: 365-21); Passed the Senate on February 25, 2014 (unanimous consent); Signed into law by President Barack Obama on March 6, 2014

The National Integrated Drought Information System Reauthorization Act of 2013 (H.R. 2431) is a bill that would reauthorize the National Integrated Drought Information System, a program that examines the impact of droughts and tries to respond to them on a federal level. The bill would extend the program until 2018.

The National Integrated Drought Information System Reauthorization Act of 2013 was introduced into the 113th United States Congress. A similar measure, the Drought Information Act of 2013 (S. 376; 113th Congress), was introduced into and passed the United States Senate. President Barack Obama signed the National Integrated Drought Information System Reauthorization Act of 2013 into law as Pub. L. 113–86 (text) (PDF) on March 6, 2014.<refll name="2431allactions"/>

== Background ==
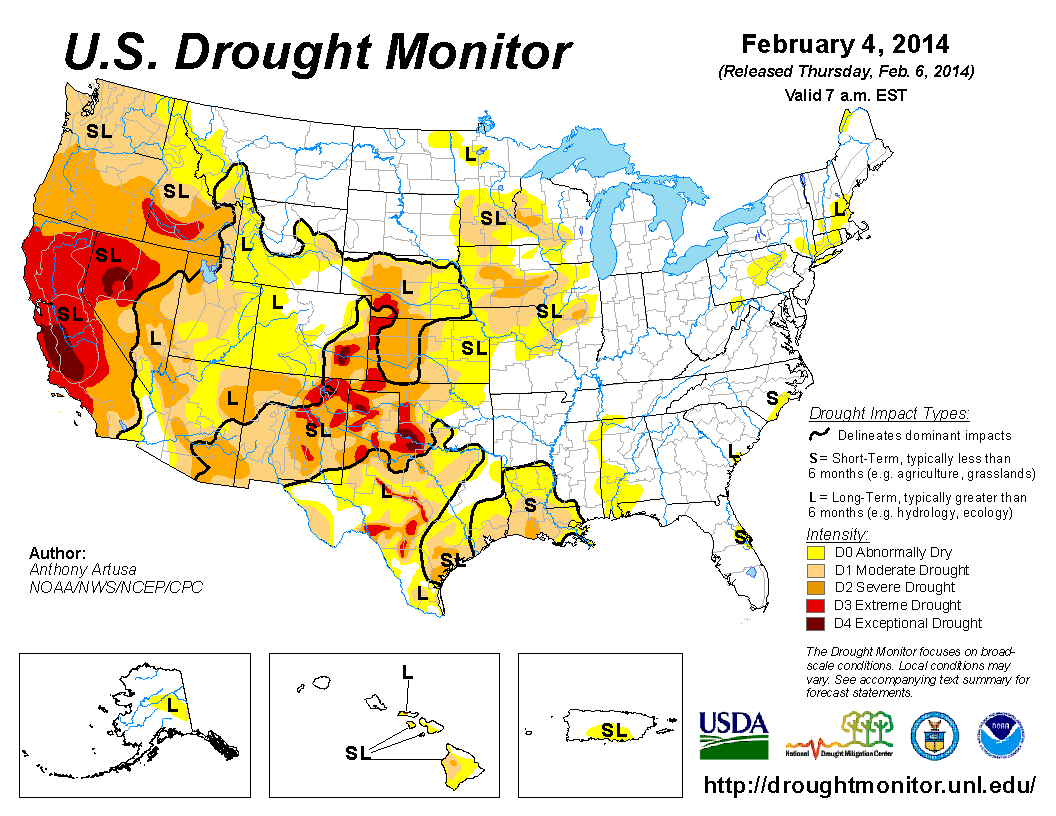
United States Drought Monitor from February 4, 2014

The National Integrated Drought Information System (NIDIS) Act was signed into law in 2006 (Public Law 109-430). The Western Governors' Association described the need for NIDIS in a 2004 report, Creating a Drought Early Warning System for the 21st Century: The National Integrated Drought Information System. The NIDIS Act calls for an interagency, multi-partner approach to drought monitoring, forecasting, and early warning, led by the National Oceanic and Atmospheric Administration (NOAA). The law also created the U.S. Drought Portal. NIDIS is part of the National Oceanic and Atmospheric Administration in the Climate Program Office.

At the time that this legislation was being consider in committee, there were serious on-going water shortages in the United States. A drought that started in 2012 caused "some of the Great Lakes to drop to record lows," hurt farms, and effected shipping on the Mississippi River.

== Provisions of the bill ==
This summary is based largely on the summary provided by the Congressional Research Service, a public domain source.

The National Integrated Drought Information System Reauthorization Act of 2013 would amend the National Integrated Drought Information System Act of 2006 to specify that the National Integrated Drought Information System (NIDIS) Program's purpose shall be to better inform and provide for more timely decisionmaking to reduce drought related impacts and costs.

The bill would revise NIDIS functions to require the NIDIS, among other things, to: (1) provide certain information, forecasts, and assessments described in the Act on both national and regional levels; (2) build upon existing forecasting and assessment programs and partnerships through designation of one or more cooperative institutes to assist with NIDIS functions; and (3) continue ongoing research and monitoring activities related to drought.

The bill would require the Under Secretary of Commerce for Oceans and Atmosphere (who is also the Administrator of the National Oceanic and Atmospheric Administration (NOAA)) to report to Congress on the NIDIS Program.

The bill would reauthorize NIDIS through FY2018.

== Congressional Budget Office report ==

This summary is based largely on the summary provided by the Congressional Budget Office, as ordered reported by the House Committee on Science, Space, and Technology on December 5, 2013. This is a public domain source.

H.R. 2431 would amend the National Integrated Drought Information System Act of 2006. The bill would authorize the appropriation of $13.5 million annually over the 2014-2018 period for the National Oceanic and Atmospheric Administration (NOAA) to maintain a system to provide early warnings of droughts by collecting and disseminating information and coordinating research on drought conditions.

Assuming appropriation of the authorized amounts, the Congressional Budget Office (CBO) estimates that implementing the legislation would cost $60 million over the 2014-2018 period and $8 million after 2018. Enacting H.R. 2431 would not affect direct spending or revenues; therefore, pay-as-you-go procedures do not apply.

H.R. 2431 contains no intergovernmental or private-sector mandates as defined in the Unfunded Mandates Reform Act and would impose no costs on state, local, or tribal governments.

== Procedural history ==
The National Integrated Drought Information System Reauthorization Act of 2013 was introduced into the United States House of Representatives on June 19, 2013 by Rep. Ralph M. Hall (R, TX-4). The bill was referred to the United States House Committee on Science, Space and Technology and the United States House Science Subcommittee on Environment. On February 7, 2014, House Majority Leader Eric Cantor announced that H.R. 2431 would be on the House schedule for February 11 or 12th, 2014, to be considered under a suspension of the rules. On February 10, 2014, the House voted in Roll Call Vote 55 to pass the bill 365-21. On February 25, 2014, the United States Senate voted to pass the bill by unanimous consent. President Barack Obama signed it into law as Pub. L. 113–86 (text) (PDF) on March 6, 2014.

== Debate and discussion ==
Rep. Ralph Hall, speaking in support of the bill, said that "the National Integrated Drought Information System has been a highly effective program that provides the best available information and tools to monitor and predict droughts, assess the potential impacts, and better prepare for and mitigate the effects of droughts."

Supporters of the bill argued that the system is necessary to collect information needed to analyse weather and climate data. Executive Director of the Western States Water Council Tony Willardson argues in favor of the bill, saying that "it's hard to analyze data you don't have... NIDIS is a very important tool for evaluating the impacts of drought. It's what we've been looking for, for a long time, as a clearinghouse of drought information."

== See also ==
- List of bills in the 113th United States Congress
