= Drought Information Act of 2013 =

- Long title: To reauthorize the National Integrated Drought Information System, and for other purposes.
- Announced in: the 113th United States Congress
- Sponsored by: Sen. Mark L. Pryor (D, AR)
- Number of co-sponsors: 4

Codification
- Acts affected: National Integrated Drought Information System Act of 2006, VRAP Extension Act of 2013
- U.S.C. sections affected: 15 U.S.C. § 313d
- Agencies affected: United States Department of Agriculture, Farm Service Agency, National Oceanic and Atmospheric Administration
- Authorizations of appropriations: $14,500,000 for each of fiscal years 2014, 2015, 2016, 2017, and 2018, for a total of $72,500,000 over five years

Legislative history
- Introduced in the Senate as S. 376 by Sen. Mark L. Pryor (D, AR) on February 25, 2013; Committee consideration by United States Senate Committee on Commerce, Science and Transportation; Passed the Senate on February 3, 2014 (unanimous consent)

The Drought Information Act of 2013 (S. 376) is a bill that would authorize funding for the National Integrated Drought Information System (NIDIS) through 2018. The NIDIS is "charged with providing timely information to prevent drought and extreme weather damage."

The bill passed in the United States Senate during the 113th United States Congress. A similar bill, the National Integrated Drought Information System Reauthorization Act of 2013 (H.R. 2431; 113th Congress), was introduced in the United States House of Representatives and considered around the same time. That bill became Pub. L. 113–86 (text) (PDF) on March 6, 2014.

== Background ==

The Western Governors' Association described the need for NIDIS in a 2004 report, Creating a Drought Early Warning System for the 21st Century: The National Integrated Drought Information System. The NIDIS is supposed to be an interagency, multi-partner approach to drought monitoring, forecasting, and early warning, led by the National Oceanic and Atmospheric Administration (NOAA).

== Provisions of the bill ==
This summary is based largely on the summary provided by the Congressional Research Service, a public domain source.

Drought Information Act of 2013 would amend the National Integrated Drought Information System Act of 2006 to specify that: (1) the Under Secretary of Commerce for Oceans and Atmosphere shall continue to support the National Integrated Drought Information System (NIDIS) Program, and (2) the program's purpose shall be to better inform and provide for more timely decisionmaking to reduce drought related impacts and costs.

The bill would revise NIDIS functions to require the NIDIS to, among other things: (1) provide certain information (including concerning water supplies and soil moisture), forecasts, and assessments described in the Act on both national and regional levels; and (2) continue ongoing research and monitoring activities related to drought and the role of extreme weather events and climate variability in drought.

The bill would require the Under Secretary to provide a report to Congress concerning the NIDIS Program that includes a list of partners with whom the Under Secretary collaborates on NIDIS implementation and a description of NIDIS outreach activities.

The bill would authorize appropriations to carry out the Act through Fiscal Year 2018.

== Congressional Budget Office report ==
This summary is based largely on the summary provided by the Congressional Budget Office, as ordered reported by the Senate Committee on Commerce, Science, and Transportation on July 30, 2013. This is a public domain source.

S. 376 would amend the National Integrated Drought Information System Act of 2006. The bill would authorize the appropriation of $14.5 million annually over the 2014-2018 period for the National Oceanic and Atmospheric Administration (NOAA) to maintain a system to provide early warnings of droughts by collecting and disseminating information and coordinating research on drought conditions. In 2013, the agency received $12 million to carry out similar activities.

Assuming appropriation of the authorized amounts, the Congressional Budget Office (CBO) estimates that implementing the legislation would cost $65 million over the 2014-2018 period and $8 million after 2018. Enacting S. 376 would not affect direct spending or revenues; therefore, pay-as-you-go procedures do not apply.

S. 376 contains no intergovernmental or private-sector mandates as defined in the Unfunded Mandates Reform Act.

== Procedural history ==
The Drought Information Act of 2013 was introduced into the United States Senate on February 25, 2013, by Sen. Mark L. Pryor (D, AR). It was referred to the United States Senate Committee on Commerce, Science and Transportation. On October 28, 2013, it was reported by the committee alongside Committee Report 113-114. On February 3, 2014, the Senate passed the bill by unanimous consent.

== Debate and discussion ==
Senators Mark Pryor, Jerry Moran, John Thune, Tom Udall, and Mark Udall jointly introduced the bill and were all strong supporters.

== See also ==
- List of bills in the 113th United States Congress
- Drought in the United States
