= 2008 United States Senate election in Arkansas =

- November 4, 2008
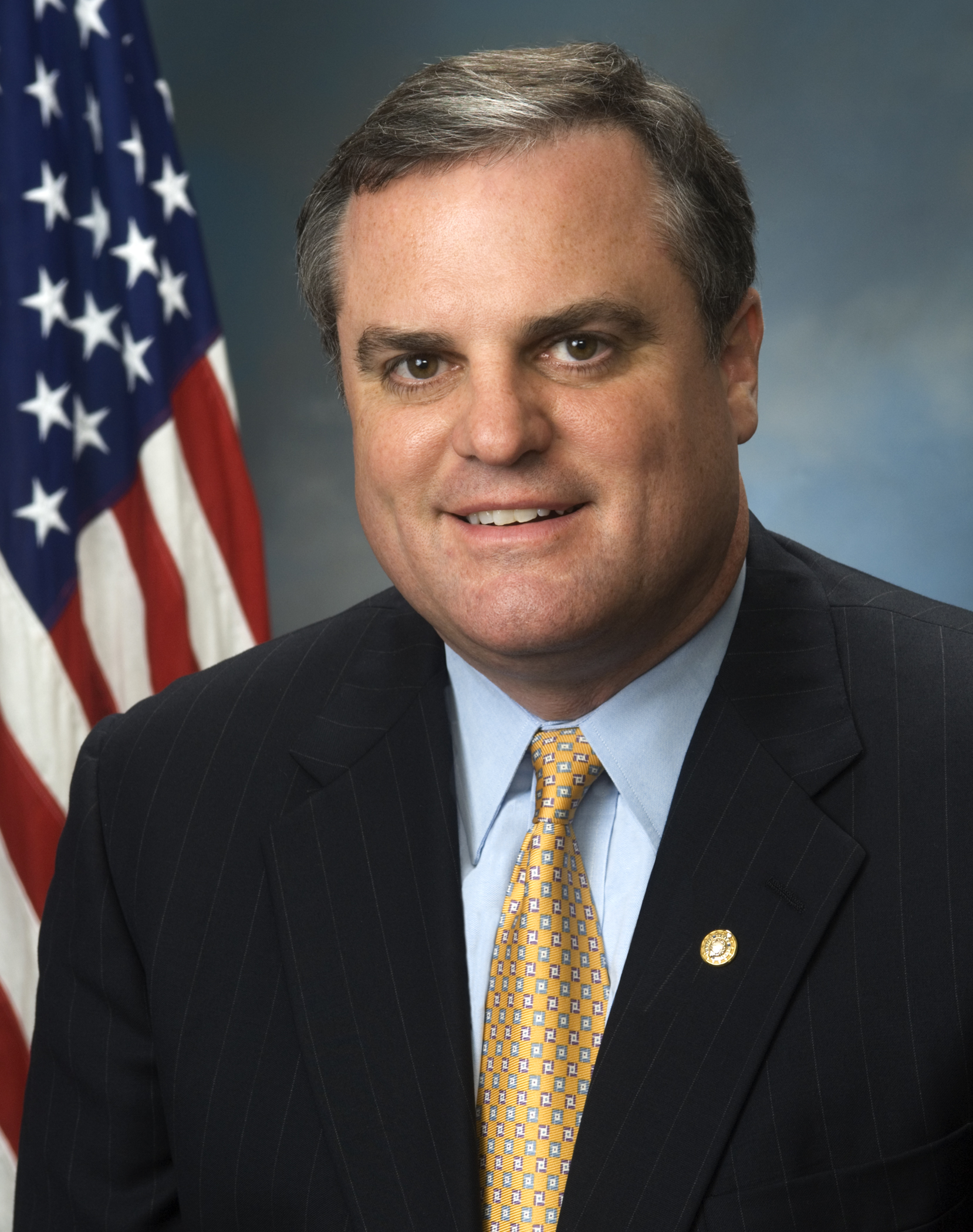

Nominee	Mark Pryor	Rebekah Kennedy
Party	Democratic	Green
Popular vote	804,678	207,076
Percentage	79.53%	20.47%
- County results Pryor: 60–70% 70–80% 80–90% >90%
U.S. senator before election
Mark Pryor
Democratic
Elected U.S. Senator
Mark Pryor
Democratic

The 2008 United States Senate election in Arkansas was held on November 4, 2008. Incumbent Senator Mark Pryor ran for a second term. No Republican filed to challenge him, and his only opponent was Green Party candidate Rebekah Kennedy. Pryor won re-election with almost 80% of the vote, also winning every county.

Kennedy received the highest ever vote share of any Green Party candidate running for U.S. Senate, and the highest for a third party Senate candidate in Arkansas until her record was surpassed by Libertarian candidate Ricky Dale Harrington Jr. in 2020.

As of 2026, this was the last time Democrats won a U.S. Senate election in Arkansas, and the last Arkansas U.S. Senate race where any candidate won every county. With Republican John McCain winning the state in the concurrent presidential race, this is also the last time that Arkansas simultaneously voted for presidential and U.S. Senate candidates of different parties. To date, Pryor has the highest raw vote total ever in the history of statewide elections in Arkansas. This was Pryor’s last successful campaign for elected office; he was defeated for re-election to the Senate in 2014.

== Candidates ==
=== Democratic ===
- Mark Pryor, incumbent U.S. senator

=== Green ===
- Rebekah Kennedy, attorney and nominee for attorney general in 2006 and 2010

== General election ==
=== Campaign ===
On March 10, the state Republican Party announced it had no plans to field a candidate against Pryor. The only Republican to express interest in the race, health care executive Tom Formicola, decided not to run on the weekend before filing began. Formicola lost the GOP primaries for the Senate in 2004 and the United States House of Representatives in 2006. As a result, Pryor was the only senator in 2008 to face no major-party opposition in a reelection bid.

There had been speculation that former Governor Mike Huckabee would run against Pryor if his presidential bid were unsuccessful, but on March 8, Huckabee said he would not contest the race.

Pryor's sole challenger was Green Party nominee Rebekah Kennedy, who entered the race in April 2007. Kennedy received 206,504 votes (20.54%). This is the highest percentage of the vote for any Green Party candidate running for U.S. Senate ever, and her 206,504 votes is the second most total votes received by a Green Party candidate for U.S. Senate after Medea Susan Benjamin's 326,828 votes in the 2000 California Senate race. Kennedy's campaign, in addition to being record breaking for the Green Party, was also the strongest showing of any independent or third-party candidate running for the U.S. Senate in 2008.

=== Predictions ===
Source	Ranking	As of
The Cook Political Report	Safe D	October 23, 2008
CQ Politics	Safe D	October 31, 2008
Rothenberg Political Report	Safe D	November 2, 2008
Real Clear Politics	Safe D	November 4, 2008

=== Polling ===
Pryor was polled at 90% in a poll without a challenger in March.

=== Results ===
2008 United States Senate election in Arkansas
Party	Candidate	Votes	%
Democratic	Mark Pryor (incumbent)	804,678	79.53%
Green	Rebekah Kennedy	207,076	20.47%
Total votes		1,011,754	100.00%
Democratic hold			

== See also ==
- 2008 United States Senate elections
- 2002 United States Senate election in Arkansas
