= National Integrated Drought Information System =

US legislative instrument

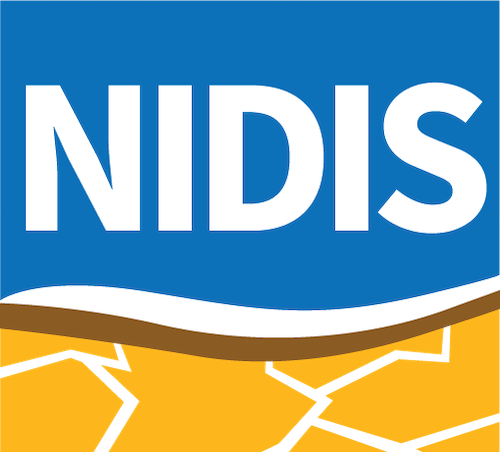
Logo for NOAA's National Integrated Drought Information System (NIDIS)

The National Integrated Drought Information System (NIDIS) Act was signed into law in 2006 (Public Law 109-430) and was reauthorized in 2014 and 2019. The Western Governors' Association described the need for NIDIS in a 2004 report, Creating a Drought Early Warning System for the 21st Century: The National Integrated Drought Information System. The NIDIS Act calls for an interagency, multi-partner approach to drought monitoring, forecasting, and early warning, led by the National Oceanic and Atmospheric Administration (NOAA).

NIDIS’s mission is "to improve the nation’s capacity to proactively manage drought-related risks, by providing those affected with the best available information and resources to assess the potential for drought and to better prepare for, mitigate, and respond to the effects of drought." Toward that end, NIDIS will create a drought early warning system for the nation.

Building the foundation for a national drought early warning system, NIDIS supports eight regional drought early warning systems (DEWS) across the United States, which rely on networks of federal, tribal, state, local, and academic partners to make climate and drought science accessible and useful for decision makers: California-Nevada, Intermountain West, Midwest, Missouri River Basin, Northeast, Pacific Northwest, Southeast, and Southern Plains.

NIDIS draws on the personnel, experience, and networks of the National Drought Mitigation Center, the NOAA Regional Climate Centers, and the Regional Integrated Sciences and Assessments (RISAs), among others. Federal agencies and departments partnering in NIDIS include the U.S. Army Corps of Engineers, the Bureau of Reclamation, the U.S. Geological Survey, NASA, the U.S. Department of Energy, the U.S. Environmental Protection Agency, the National Science Foundation, and the Natural Resources Conservation Service.

NIDIS is building on existing system infrastructure, data, and operational products from various agencies. For example, it incorporates data from the SNOTEL (SNOw TELemetry) network of the U.S. Department of Agriculture’s Natural Resources Conservation Service, reservoir and streamflow levels from the U.S. Department of the Interior and the U.S. Army Corps of Engineers, and river forecasts from the National Weather Service. It incorporates operational products such as the U.S. Drought Monitor and the Seasonal Drought Outlook. Researchers are working to help decision-makers in many contexts by making drought monitoring, forecasting, and impacts information available at a variety of spatial scales and geopolitical boundaries, including regional, watershed, county and tribal. NIDIS is a prototype for information services, in support of preparing for and adapting to climate variation and change.

In late 2007, NIDIS launched the U.S. Drought Portal, or drought.gov, a website that pulls together many federal, state, and academic resources for monitoring drought. In January 2021, NIDIS worked with NOAA's National Centers for Environmental Information to launch a completed redesigned U.S. Drought Portal. The new website features updated content and new interactive architecture designed to provide actionable, shareable information and easy-to-understand graphics describing current drought conditions and forecasts by city, county, state, zip code, and at watershed to global scales. The U.S. Drought Portal also aggregates and presents drought impact data for economic sectors such as agriculture, energy, water utilities, and recreation using interactive maps and data.

The NIDIS Program is supported by the NOAA Climate Program Office and is housed at the NOAA Earth System Research Laboratories in Boulder, Colorado.

== Related legislation ==
- Drought Information Act of 2013 (S. 376; 113th Congress) - a bill that would authorize funding for the National Integrated Drought Information System (NIDIS) through 2018. The bill passed in the United States Senate during the 113th United States Congress.
- National Integrated Drought Information System Reauthorization Act of 2013 (H.R. 2431; 113th Congress) - a bill that would authorize funding for the National Integrated Drought Information System through 2018. The bill was scheduled for a vote on the House floor.
- An Act to Reauthorize the National Integrated Drought Information System (P.L. 113-86, 128 STAT. 1015)
