= 1998 Arkansas Attorney General election =

- November 3, 1998
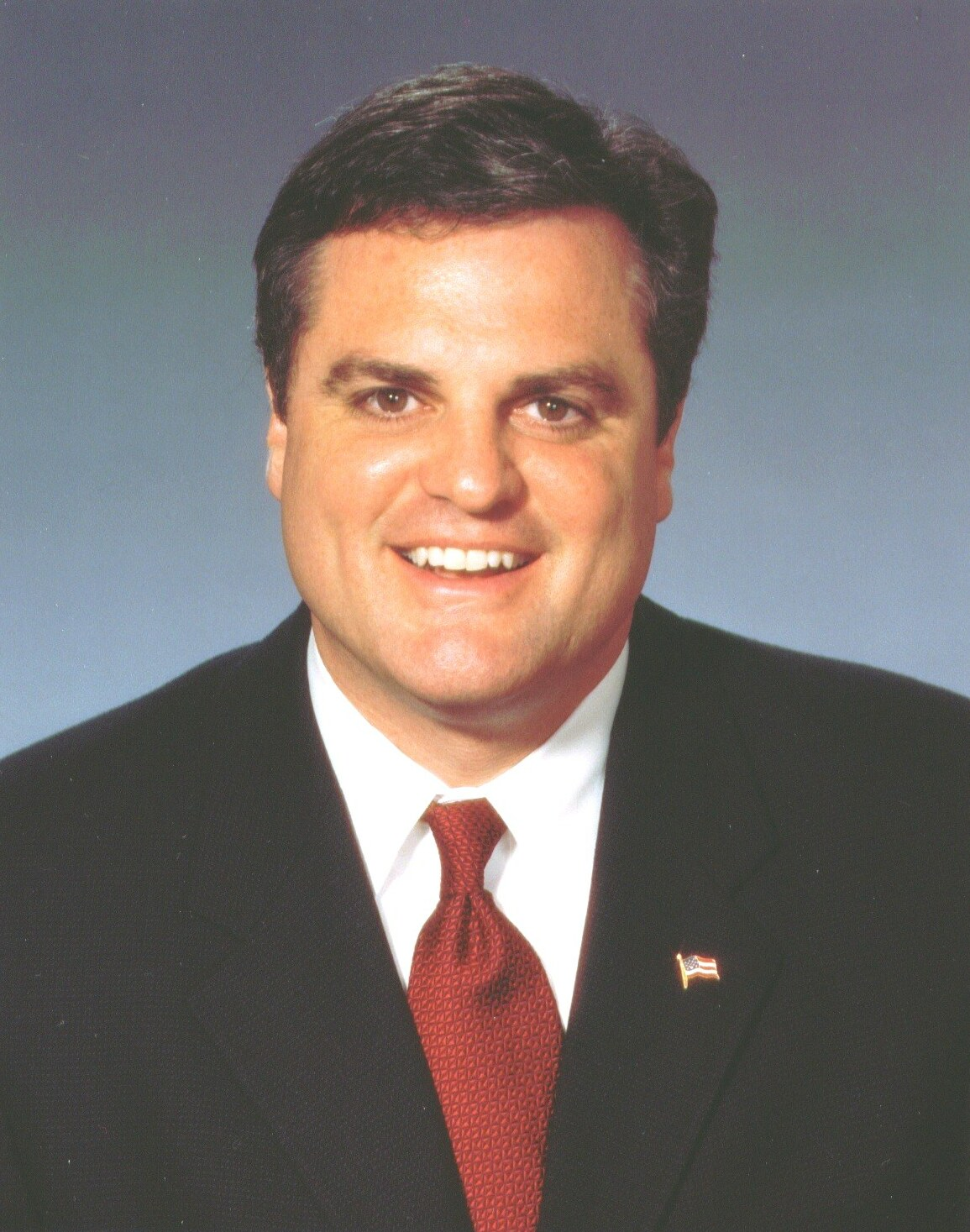

Candidate	Mark Pryor	Betty Dickey
Party	Democratic	Republican
Popular vote	411,567	287,844
Percentage	58.84%	41.16%
- County results Pryor: 50–60% 60–70% 70–80% Dickey: 50–60%
Attorney General before election
Winston Bryant
Democratic
Elected Attorney General
Mark Pryor
Democratic

The 1998 Arkansas Attorney General election was held on November 3, 1998 to elect the Arkansas Attorney General. Democratic incumbent Winston Bryant did not seek re-election to a third term in office, instead unsuccessfully running in the Democratic primary for U.S. Senate. Democratic nominee and former Arkansas state representative Mark Pryor won the election, defeating Republican prosecuting attorney Betty Dickey by 18 percentage points.

== General election ==
=== Candidates ===
- Mark Pryor, former Arkansas state representative (1991–1995)
- Betty Dickey, prosecuting attorney for the Eleventh Judicial Circuit of Arkansas

=== Results ===
1998 Arkansas Attorney General election results
Party	Candidate	Votes	%	±%
Democratic	Mark Pryor	411,567	58.84%	−21.63%
Republican	Betty Dickey	287,844	41.16%	+21.63%
Total votes		699,411	100.00%	
Democratic hold				
