= Green Party of Arkansas =

Arkansas affiliate of the Green Party

- Membership (2026): ▲124
- Ideology: Green politics
- National affiliation: Green Party of the United States
- Colors: Green
- Seats in the U.S. Senate: 0 / 2
- Seats in the U.S. House: 0 / 4
- Arkansas Senate: 0 / 35
- Arkansas House of Representatives: 0 / 100
- Other elected officials: 0 (February 2024)

Website
- Green Party of Arkansas

The Green Party of Arkansas is the state party organization for Arkansas of the Green Party of the United States.

With the November 2008 election of Richard Carroll as representative for the 39th District (Little Rock) in the Arkansas House of Representatives, the Arkansas Green Party gained its first ever state representative in the state's history. Later, former Democratic representative Fred Smith would be elected to the Arkansas House in 2012 on the Green Party line.

Greens achieved their first electoral victory in Arkansas in 1992 when Stephan Miller was elected Alderman for Fayetteville, Ward 1. He was joined on the City Council in 1996 by Randy Zurcher when he was elected to represent Fayetteville, Ward 2.

== Electoral history ==
=== 2006 election ===
In 2006 the party ran candidates for statewide offices for the first time. Jim Lendall, their candidate for governor, was an Arkansas legislator for eight years as both an independent and Democrat, before joining the party in the spring of 2005. All of the Green candidates were denied ballot access when the party turned in petitions containing 10,000 signatures. The party went to court with the help of the state ACLU in order to get on the ballot. The state required 10,000 petition signatures for independent candidates, but signatures from 3% of those who voted in the previous gubernatorial or presidential election for Third Party candidates. On 23 August 2006 a federal judge in Little Rock agreed and declared the Third Party rule unconstitutional, ordering the state to place Green Party candidates on the ballot.

- Governor - Jim Lendall - 12,774 1.65%
- Attorney General - Rebekah Kennedy - 33,386 4.40%
- Secretary of State - Ralph 'Marty' Scully - 22,773 2.99%
- State Treasurer - Brock Carpenter - 28,861 3.82%
- Auditor of State - Michael Bolzenius - 106,515 15.13%
- Commissioner of State Lands - Robert David Lewis - 126,135 18.08%

=== 2007–2008 ===
The party began its party petition for 2008 on July 28, 2007. Under a law passed earlier this year, party petitions require 10,000 valid signatures and must be completed in any 60-day period that the group chooses. in 2006 the law permitted four months. On September 26, 2007, the Green Party of Arkansas submitted 17,197 signatures to the secretary of state's office. Assuming there are at least 10,000 valid signatures, the Green Party would then be a qualified party in Arkansas for 2008, able to nominate for all partisan office in the state, by convention. The secretary of state's office had 30 days to check and verify the signatures, and on October 17, the Arkansas Green Party was notified that its petition has been certified.

2008 was the first time the Green Party had a separate primary ballot in Arkansas. There were four candidates filed to run in the presidential primary Cynthia McKinney, Kent Mesplay, Kat Swift, and Jared Ball. In January 2008, Ball withdrew from the campaign and endorsed McKinney but his name was not removed from the ballot.

The presidential primary was held on Super Tuesday, February 5, 2008. The results of the primary were as follows:

Jared A. Ball (Green) 81 10.34%
Cynthia McKinney (Green) 157 20.05%
Kent Mesplay (Green) 61 7.79%
Kat Swift (Green) 46 5.87%
Uncommitted (Green) 438 55.94%

Over half of the Green primary voters choose to an uncommitted slate of delegates. The large number of uncommitted votes may indicate support for Ralph Nader, dissatisfaction or unfamiliarity with the candidates on the ballot. Nader subsequently announced that he would not seek the Green nomination.

The Green Party of Arkansas nominated a record number of candidates for the 2008 state and local elections, exceeding the endorsements of the People's Party in 1892.

The 2008 campaign was remarkable for the number of Green candidates facing otherwise unopposed incumbents. Rebekah Kennedy who in 2006 ran for Attorney General ran for the United States Senate versus incumbent Democrat Mark Pryor without Republican opposition. Kennedy received 206,504 votes for 20.54% of the vote, her percentage was the best ever for a Green candidate for Senate and the vote total was the second best. Likewise, Abel Tomlinson, a University of Arkansas graduate student, was the sole challenger to Republican John Boozman for the 3rd Congressional district seat. Tomlinson received 58,850 votes (21.4%). Green Deb McFarland (64,398 votes, 23.2%) opposed Democrat Vic Snyder in the 2nd Congressional district, and received the best percentage ever for a green candidate for US house. Joshua Drake (32,603 votes 13.8%) sought the 4th Congressional district seat against Democrat Mike Ross.

== Candidates nominated ==
=== 2008 ===
- U.S. Senate - Rebekah Kennedy (20.6%)
- U.S. Congress Second District - Deb McFarland (23.3%)
- U.S. Congress Third District - Abel Tomlinson (21.5%)
- U.S. Congress Fourth District - Joshua Drake (13.8%)
- State Rep. District 33 - Conrad Harvin
- State Rep. District 39 - Richard Carroll (won)
- State Rep. District 42 - Gene Mason
- State Rep. District 50 - Brian Barnett
- State Rep. District 68 - Mary Boley
- State Rep. District 90 - Wendy Crow
- Chicot County Assessor - Elizabeth McCoy
- Pulaski County JP District 6 - Wainnette Copass
- Sebastian County JP District 4 - Richard Suits

Fayetteville City Council - Bernard Sulliban (non-partisan position)

=== 2010 ===
- U.S. Senate - John L. Gray
- Attorney General - Rebekah Kennedy
- Saline County County Collector - Joy Ballard (won)

== Presidential nominee results ==
Year	Nominee	Votes	%
1996	Ralph Nader	3,649	0.41 / 100
2000	Ralph Nader	13,421	1.50 / 100
2004	David Cobb	1,488	0.10 / 100
2008	Cynthia McKinney	3,470	0.32 / 100
2012	Jill Stein	9,305	0.87 / 100
2016	Jill Stein	9,473	0.84 / 100
2020	Howie Hawkins	2,980	0.24 / 100
2024	Jill Stein	4,275	0.36 / 100

== See also ==
- List of State Green Parties
- Arkansas Libertarian Party
- Political party strength in Arkansas
- Politics of Arkansas
- Government of Arkansas
- Elections in Arkansas
- Law of Arkansas
- List of politics by U.S. state
