= 2002 United States Senate election in Arkansas =

- November 5, 2002
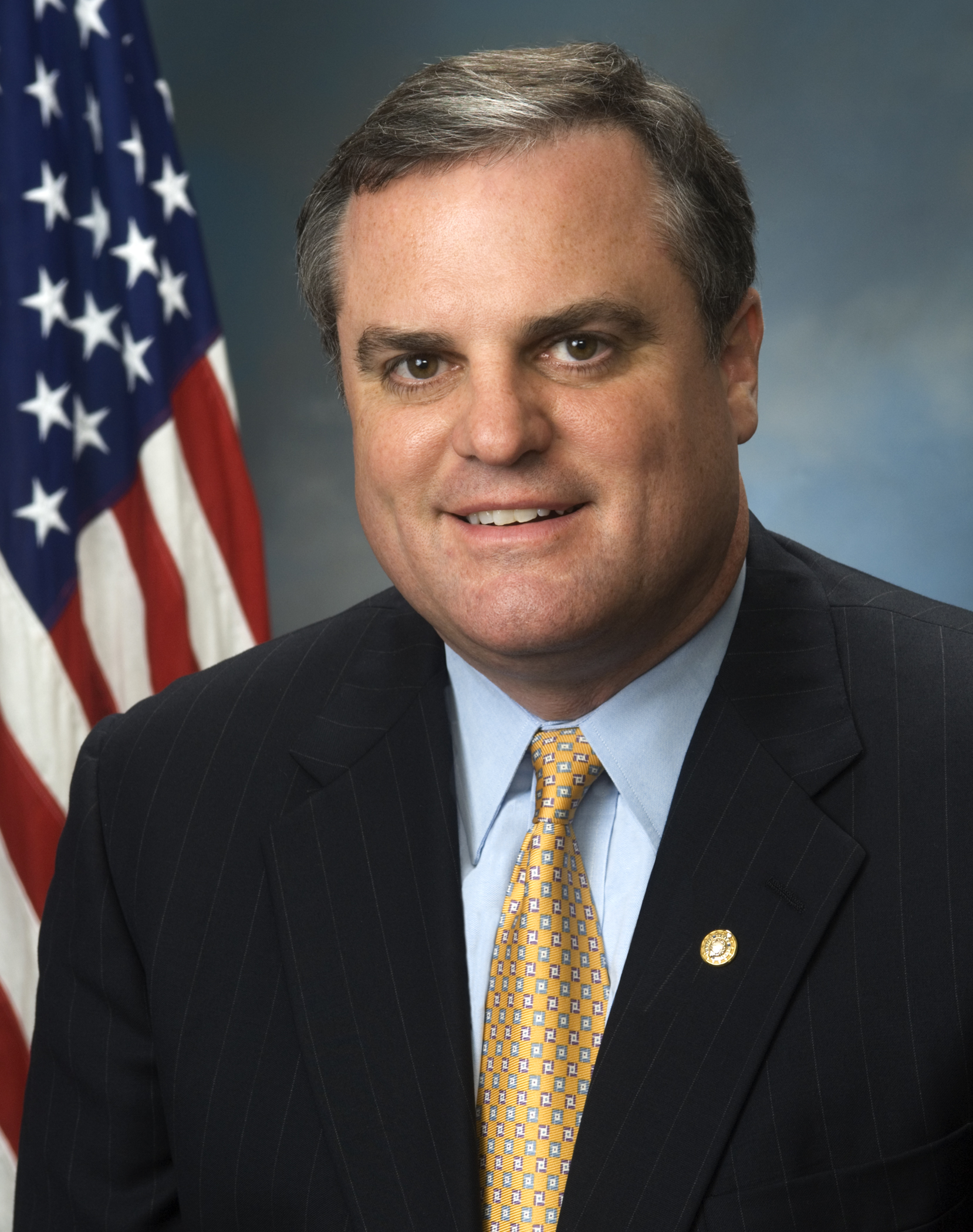

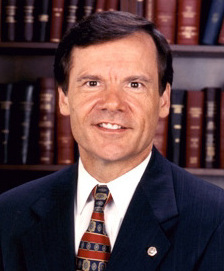
Nominee	Mark Pryor	Tim Hutchinson
Party	Democratic	Republican
Popular vote	435,347	372,909
Percentage	53.86%	46.14%
- County results Pryor: 50–60% 60–70% 70–80% Hutchinson: 50–60% 60–70%
U.S. senator before election
Tim Hutchinson
Republican
Elected U.S. Senator
Mark Pryor
Democratic

The 2002 United States Senate election in Arkansas was held on November 5, 2002. Incumbent Republican U.S. Senator Tim Hutchinson ran for a second term, but was defeated by Democratic candidate Mark Pryor, whose father David had held the seat from 1979 to 1997. This was the only Senate seat in the 2002 midterm elections to switch from Republican to Democratic, and Hutchinson was the only incumbent Republican senator to lose reelection during that cycle.

== Major candidates ==
=== Democratic ===
- Mark Pryor, attorney general of Arkansas

=== Republican ===
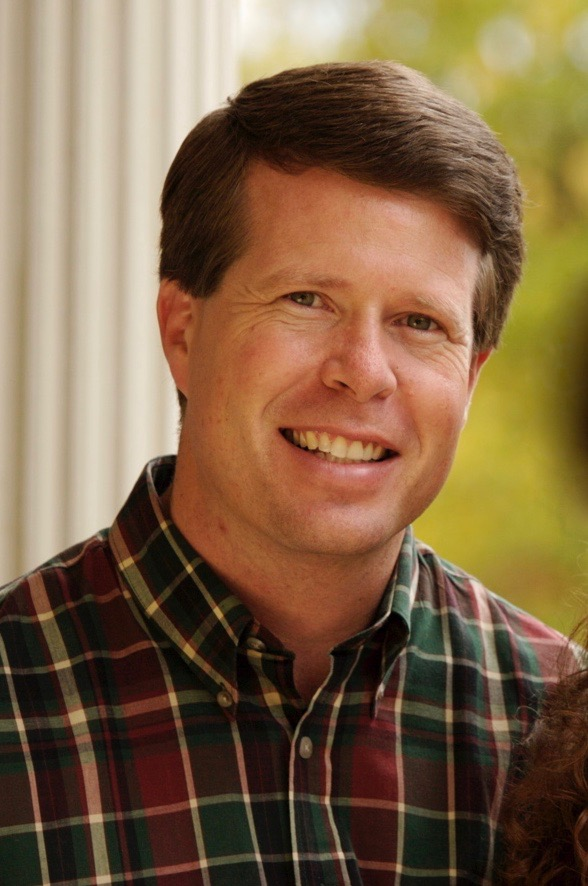
Republican Jim Bob Duggar challenged Hutchinson in the primary.

- Jim Bob Duggar, state representative
- Tim Hutchinson, incumbent U.S. senator

Republican primary results
Party	Candidate	Votes	%
Republican	Tim Hutchinson (incumbent)	71,576	77.7%
Republican	Jim Bob Duggar	20,546	22.3%
Total votes		92,116	100.0%

Republican primary results by county Hutchinson: 60–70%; 70–80%; 80–90%; >90%

== General election ==
=== Debates ===
- Complete video of debate, October 14, 2002

=== Predictions ===
Source	Ranking	As of
Sabato's Crystal Ball	Lean D (flip)	November 4, 2002

=== Results ===
2002 United States Senate election in Arkansas
Party	Candidate	Votes	%
Democratic	Mark Pryor	435,347	53.86%
Republican	Tim Hutchinson (incumbent)	372,909	46.14%
Total votes		808,256	100.0%
Democratic gain from Republican			

==== Counties that flipped from Republican to Democratic ====
- Columbia (largest city: Magnolia)
- Craighead (largest city: Jonesboro)
- Conway (largest city: Morrilton)
- Franklin (largest city: Ozark)
- Garland (largest city: Hot Springs)
- Independence (largest city: Batesville)
- Johnson (largest city: Clarksville)
- Logan (largest city: Booneville)
- Perry (largest city: Perryville)
- Sharp (largest city: Cherokee Village)
- Stone (largest city: Mountain View)
- Union (largest city: El Dorado)
- Van Buren (largest city: Clinton)
- Yell (largest city: Dardanelle)

== See also ==
- 2002 United States Senate elections
