= Western Governors Association =

Group of American governors in western states and territories

The Western Governors' Association (WGA) is a non-partisan organization of all 22 United States governors (representing 19 U.S. states and 3 U.S. territories) that are considered to be part of the Western region of the nation.

The WGA also invites Canadian premiers (the leader of the provincial parliamentary party) of Western Canada to its annual conference.

Western Governors University, an autonomous private non-profit online university, was co-founded by Western governors from a plan that originated in WGA meetings in the 1990s.

== History ==
The WGA was founded in 1984, as the result of the merger of two previous organizations, the Western Governors Conference (based in San Francisco) and the Western Governors Policy Office (based in Denver). It initially consisted of the governors of 16 states; Kansas, Oklahoma, and Texas joined later on.

== List of current Western governors ==
The current chair of the WGA is Democrat Michelle Lujan Grisham of New Mexico and the vice chair is Republican Spencer Cox of Utah.

| Current governor | State | Past | Party | Assumed office | Term ending |
|---|---|---|---|---|---|
| Mike Dunleavy | Alaska | List | Republican | 2018 | 2026 (term-limited) |
| Pula Nikolao Pula | American Samoa | List | Republican | 2025 | 2029 |
| Katie Hobbs | Arizona | List | Democratic | 2023 | 2027 |
| Gavin Newsom | California | List | Democratic | 2019 | 2027 (term-limited) |
| Jared Polis | Colorado | List | Democratic | 2019 | 2027 (term-limited) |
| Lou Leon Guerrero | Guam | List | Democratic | 2019 | 2027 (term-limited) |
| Josh Green | Hawaii | List | Democratic | 2022 | 2026 |
| Brad Little | Idaho | List | Republican | 2019 | 2027 |
| Laura Kelly | Kansas | List | Democratic | 2019 | 2027 (term-limited) |
| Greg Gianforte | Montana | List | Republican | 2021 | 2029 (term-limited) |
| Jim Pillen | Nebraska | List | Republican | 2023 | 2027 |
| Joe Lombardo | Nevada | List | Republican | 2023 | 2027 |
| Michelle Lujan Grisham | New Mexico | List | Democratic | 2019 | 2027 (term-limited) |
| David M. Apatang | Northern Mariana Islands | List | Independent | 2025 | 2027 (retiring) |
| Kelly Armstrong | North Dakota | List | Republican | 2024 | 2028 |
| Kevin Stitt | Oklahoma | List | Republican | 2019 | 2027 (term-limited) |
| Tina Kotek | Oregon | List | Democratic | 2023 | 2027 |
| Larry Rhoden | South Dakota | List | Republican | 2025 | 2027 |
| Greg Abbott | Texas | List | Republican | 2015 | 2027 |
| Spencer Cox | Utah | List | Republican | 2021 | 2029 |
| Bob Ferguson | Washington | List | Democratic | 2025 | 2029 |
| Mark Gordon | Wyoming | List | Republican | 2019 | 2027 (term-limited) |

The premiers of Canada's Western provinces are also typically invited to attend WGA meetings.

| Current premier | Province | Past | Party | Assumed office |
|---|---|---|---|---|
| Danielle Smith | Alberta | List | United Conservative | 2022 |
| David Eby | British Columbia | List | New Democratic | 2022 |
| Wab Kinew | Manitoba | List | New Democratic | 2023 |
| Scott Moe | Saskatchewan | List | Saskatchewan Party | 2018 |
