= 2022 United States gubernatorial elections =

- November 8, 2022

39 governorships 36 states; 3 territories
	Majority party	Minority party
Party	Republican	Democratic
Seats before	28	22
Seats after	26	24
Seat change	▼2	▲2
Popular vote	43,126,140	43,336,108
Percentage	49.05%	49.29%
Seats up	20	16
Seats won	18	18
- Democratic hold Democratic gain Republican hold Republican gain Independent gain No election

United States gubernatorial elections were held on November 8, 2022, in 36 states and three territories. As most governors serve four-year terms, the last regular gubernatorial elections for all but two of the seats took place in 2018. (Note: New Hampshire's Chris Sununu and Vermont's Phil Scott, each of whom serves two-year terms, ran in 2020.) The gubernatorial elections took place concurrently with several other federal, state, and local elections, as part of the 2022 midterm elections.

Democrats performed better than expected, (Note: In midterm elections, the party of the President of the United States usually suffers a net loss of 6 or more gubernatorial offices. The most recent midterm where that has happened was 2018's blue wave under then-President Donald Trump, when he lost seven governorships to the Democrats in the that year's gubernatorial election slate.) including in closely-watched races in Kansas, Michigan, Pennsylvania, and Wisconsin, and the party picked up the governorships of Arizona, Maryland, and Massachusetts. Republicans picked up the governorship of Nevada, making incumbent Democrat Steve Sisolak the only incumbent to lose his seat, the first Democrat since the 2014 Illinois gubernatorial election, and the first of any party since the 2019 Kentucky gubernatorial election.

This is the first midterm cycle since 1998 in which the non-incumbent party suffered net losses, the first since 1986 in which the incumbent party gained seats overall, and the first since 1934 in which Democrats did so. Democrats won the popular vote in this gubernatorial election cycle by 0.24 points, making this the closest midterm gubernatorial election cycle since 2010. However, the 2019 off-year elections were won by Democrats with a smaller margin of 0.01 points.

Notably, this midterm cycle included the first gubernatorial elections since 1978 in Arizona, Kansas, Maine, and New Mexico in which a Democratic governor won election during a Democratic presidency. As of 2026, this is the last time that Republicans won the governorships in Alaska, Georgia, Iowa, Ohio, Nevada, and Texas; and the last time Democrats won the governorship in Guam.

== Partisan composition ==
Going into the election, there were 28 Republican governors and 22 Democratic governors in the United States. This class of governors is made up of 20 Republicans and 16 Democrats. In contrast to 2018, when Republicans were defending eight seats in states won by Hillary Clinton in the 2016 U.S. presidential election, Republicans held six seats in states won by Joe Biden in the 2020 U.S. presidential election (Vermont, New Hampshire, Arizona, Georgia, Massachusetts, and Maryland). Meanwhile, Democrats were defending four governorships in states Trump had previously won (Pennsylvania, Michigan, and Wisconsin in 2016, and Kansas in 2016 and 2020).

== Election predictions ==
Several sites and individuals publish predictions of competitive seats. These predictions look at factors such as the strength of the incumbent (if the incumbent is running for re-election), the strength of the candidates, and the partisan leanings of the state (reflected in part by the state's Cook Partisan Voting Index rating). The predictions assign ratings to each state, with the rating indicating the predicted advantage that a party has in winning that seat.

Most election predictors use:

- "tossup": no advantage
- "tilt" (used by some predictors): advantage that is not quite as strong as "lean"
- "lean": slight advantage
- "likely": significant, but surmountable, advantage
- "safe" or "solid": near-certain chance of victory

State	PVI	Incumbent	Last race	Cook Oct 28, 2022	IE Nov 3, 2022	Sabato Nov 7, 2022	Politico Nov 3, 2022	RCP Nov 2, 2022	Fox Nov 1, 2022	538 (Note: FiveThirtyEight has three separate models for their House and Senate ratings: Lite (polling data only), Classic (polls, fundraising, and past voting patterns), and Deluxe (Classic alongside experts' ratings). This table uses the Deluxe model.) (Note: Category ranges: Tossup: <60% both candidates; Lean: ≥60%; Likely: ≥75%; Solid: ≥95%) Nov 7, 2022	ED Nov 7, 2022	Result
Alabama	R+15	Kay Ivey	59.5% R	Solid R	Solid R	Safe R	Solid R	Safe R	Solid R	Solid R	Safe R	Ivey; 66.9% R
Alaska	R+8	Mike Dunleavy	51.4% R	Likely R	Likely R	Likely R	Likely R	Likely R	Likely R	Likely R	Likely R	Dunleavy; 50.3% R
Arizona	R+2	Doug Ducey (term-limited)	56.0% R	Tossup	Tossup	Lean R	Tossup	Tossup	Tossup	Lean R	Lean R	Hobbs; 50.3% D (flip)
Arkansas	R+16	Asa Hutchinson (term-limited)	65.3% R	Solid R	Solid R	Safe R	Solid R	Safe R	Solid R	Solid R	Safe R	Sanders; 63.0% R
California	D+13	Gavin Newsom	61.9% D	Solid D	Solid D	Safe D	Solid D	Safe D	Solid D	Solid D	Safe D	Newsom; 59.2% D
Colorado	D+4	Jared Polis	53.4% D	Solid D	Solid D	Safe D	Likely D	Likely D	Likely D	Solid D	Safe D	Polis; 58.5% D
Connecticut	D+7	Ned Lamont	49.4% D	Solid D	Solid D	Likely D	Lean D	Lean D	Likely D	Solid D	Safe D	Lamont; 56.0% D
Florida	R+3	Ron DeSantis	49.6% R	Likely R	Likely R	Safe R	Likely R	Lean R	Likely R	Solid R	Safe R	DeSantis; 59.4% R
Georgia	R+3	Brian Kemp	50.2% R	Lean R	Lean R	Likely R	Lean R	Lean R	Lean R	Likely R	Likely R	Kemp; 53.4% R
Hawaii	D+14	David Ige (term-limited)	62.7% D	Solid D	Solid D	Safe D	Solid D	Safe D	Solid D	Solid D	Safe D	Green; 63.2% D
Idaho	R+18	Brad Little	59.8% R	Solid R	Solid R	Safe R	Solid R	Safe R	Solid R	Solid R	Safe R	Little; 60.5% R
Illinois	D+7	J. B. Pritzker	54.5% D	Solid D	Solid D	Safe D	Likely D	Lean D	Solid D	Solid D	Safe D	Pritzker; 54.9% D
Iowa	R+6	Kim Reynolds	50.3% R	Solid R	Solid R	Safe R	Solid R	Likely R	Solid R	Solid R	Safe R	Reynolds; 58.0% R
Kansas	R+10	Laura Kelly	48.0% D	Tossup	Tossup	Lean R (flip)	Tossup	Tossup	Tossup	Lean D	Lean D	Kelly; 49.5% D
Maine	D+2	Janet Mills	50.9% D	Lean D	Lean D	Lean D	Lean D	Tossup	Lean D	Likely D	Lean D	Mills; 55.7% D
Maryland	D+14	Larry Hogan (term-limited)	55.4% R	Solid D (flip)	Likely D (flip)	Safe D (flip)	Solid D (flip)	Safe D (flip)	Solid D (flip)	Solid D (flip)	Safe D (flip)	Moore; 64.5% D (flip)
Massachusetts	D+15	Charlie Baker (retiring)	66.6% R	Solid D (flip)	Likely D (flip)	Safe D (flip)	Solid D (flip)	Safe D (flip)	Solid D (flip)	Solid D (flip)	Safe D (flip)	Healey; 63.8% D (flip)
Michigan	R+1	Gretchen Whitmer	53.3% D	Lean D	Tilt D	Lean D	Lean D	Tossup	Lean D	Likely D	Lean D	Whitmer; 54.5% D
Minnesota	D+1	Tim Walz	53.8% D	Likely D	Lean D	Likely D	Lean D	Tossup	Lean D	Likely D	Likely D	Walz; 52.3% D
Nebraska	R+13	Pete Ricketts (term-limited)	59.0% R	Solid R	Solid R	Safe R	Solid R	Safe R	Solid R	Solid R	Safe R	Pillen; 59.7% R
Nevada	R+1	Steve Sisolak	49.4% D	Tossup	Tossup	Lean R (flip)	Tossup	Tossup	Tossup	Lean R (flip)	Lean R (flip)	Lombardo; 48.8% R (flip)
New Hampshire	D+1	Chris Sununu	65.1% R	Solid R	Solid R	Safe R	Solid R	Safe R	Likely R	Solid R	Safe R	Sununu; 57.1% R
New Mexico	D+3	Michelle Lujan Grisham	57.2% D	Lean D	Tilt D	Lean D	Lean D	Tossup	Tossup	Likely D	Lean D	Lujan Grisham; 52.0% D
New York	D+10	Kathy Hochul	59.6% D	Likely D	Likely D	Likely D	Likely D	Tossup	Lean D	Solid D	Safe D	Hochul; 53.2% D
Ohio	R+6	Mike DeWine	50.4% R	Solid R	Solid R	Safe R	Likely R	Safe R	Likely R	Solid R	Safe R	DeWine; 62.4% R
Oklahoma	R+20	Kevin Stitt	54.3% R	Likely R	Likely R	Likely R	Likely R	Tossup	Lean R	Likely R	Safe R	Stitt; 55.4% R
Oregon	D+6	Kate Brown (term-limited)	50.1% D	Tossup	Tossup	Lean D	Tossup	Tossup	Tossup	Lean D	Lean D	Kotek; 47.0% D
Pennsylvania	R+2	Tom Wolf (term-limited)	57.8% D	Likely D	Lean D	Likely D	Likely D	Lean D	Likely D	Solid D	Likely D	Shapiro; 56.5% D
Rhode Island	D+8	Dan McKee	52.6% D	Solid D	Solid D	Likely D	Likely D	Likely D	Likely D	Solid D	Likely D	McKee; 58.1% D
South Carolina	R+8	Henry McMaster	54.0% R	Solid R	Solid R	Safe R	Solid R	Safe R	Solid R	Solid R	Safe R	McMaster; 58.1% R
South Dakota	R+16	Kristi Noem	51.0% R	Solid R	Solid R	Safe R	Likely R	Likely R	Solid R	Solid R	Safe R	Noem; 62.0% R
Tennessee	R+14	Bill Lee	59.6% R	Solid R	Solid R	Safe R	Solid R	Safe R	Solid R	Solid R	Safe R	Lee; 64.9% R
Texas	R+5	Greg Abbott	55.8% R	Likely R	Solid R	Likely R	Likely R	Lean R	Likely R	Solid R	Likely R	Abbott; 54.8% R
Vermont	D+16	Phil Scott	68.5% R	Solid R	Solid R	Safe R	Solid R	Safe R	Solid R	Solid R	Safe R	Scott; 70.9% R
Wisconsin	R+2	Tony Evers	49.5% D	Tossup	Tossup	Lean R (flip)	Tossup	Tossup	Tossup	Tossup	Lean R (flip)	Evers; 51.2% D
Wyoming	R+25	Mark Gordon	67.1% R	Solid R	Solid R	Safe R	Solid R	Safe R	Solid R	Solid R	Safe R	Gordon; 74.1% R

== Race summary ==
=== States ===
States	Governor	Party	First elected	Status	Candidates
Alabama	Kay Ivey	Republican	2017 (Note: Ivey took office after her predecessor (Robert J. Bentley) resigned. She was subsequently elected in the 2018 Alabama gubernatorial election.)	Incumbent re-elected.	▌ ✓ Kay Ivey (Republican) 66.9%; ▌Yolanda Flowers (Democratic) 29.2%; ▌Jimmy Blake (Libertarian) 3.3%
Alaska	Mike Dunleavy	Republican	2018	Incumbent re-elected.	▌ ✓ Mike Dunleavy (Republican) 50.3%; ▌Les Gara (Democratic) 24.2%; ▌Bill Walker (Independent) 20.7%; ▌Charlie Pierce (Republican) 4.5%
Arizona	Doug Ducey	Republican	2014	Incumbent term-limited. Democratic gain.	▌ ✓ Katie Hobbs (Democratic) 50.3%; ▌Kari Lake (Republican) 49.7%
Arkansas	Asa Hutchinson	Republican	2014	Incumbent term-limited. Republican hold.	▌ ✓ Sarah Huckabee Sanders (Republican) 63.0%; ▌Chris Jones (Democratic) 35.2%; ▌Ricky Harrington (Libertarian) 1.8%
California	Gavin Newsom	Democratic	2018	Incumbent re-elected.	▌ ✓ Gavin Newsom (Democratic) 59.2%; ▌Brian Dahle (Republican) 40.8%
Colorado	Jared Polis	Democratic	2018	Incumbent re-elected.	▌ ✓ Jared Polis (Democratic) 58.5%; ▌Heidi Ganahl (Republican) 39.2%; Others: ▌Kevin Ruskusky (Libertarian) 1.2%; ▌Danielle Neuschwanger (Constitution) 0.9%; ▌Paul Noel Fiorino (Unity) 0.3%
Connecticut	Ned Lamont	Democratic	2018	Incumbent re-elected.	▌ ✓ Ned Lamont (Democratic) 56.0%; ▌Bob Stefanowski (Republican) 43.1%; ▌Robert Hotaling (Independent) 1.0%
Florida	Ron DeSantis	Republican	2018	Incumbent re-elected.	▌ ✓ Ron DeSantis (Republican) 59.4%; ▌Charlie Crist (Democratic) 40.0%; Others: ▌Carmen Gimenez (Independent) 0.4%; ▌Hector Roos (Libertarian) 0.2%
Georgia	Brian Kemp	Republican	2018	Incumbent re-elected.	▌ ✓ Brian Kemp (Republican) 53.4%; ▌Stacey Abrams (Democratic) 45.9%; ▌Shane Hazel (Libertarian) 0.7%
Hawaii	David Ige	Democratic	2014	Incumbent term-limited. Democratic hold.	▌ ✓ Josh Green (Democratic) 63.2%; ▌Duke Aiona (Republican) 36.8%
Idaho	Brad Little	Republican	2018	Incumbent re-elected.	▌ ✓ Brad Little (Republican) 60.5%; ▌Stephen Heidt (Democratic) 20.3%; ▌Ammon Bundy (Independent) 17.2%; Others: ▌Paul Sand (Libertarian) 1.1%; ▌Chantyrose Davison (Constitution) 0.9%
Illinois	J. B. Pritzker	Democratic	2018	Incumbent re-elected.	▌ ✓ J. B. Pritzker (Democratic) 54.9%; ▌Darren Bailey (Republican) 42.4%; ▌Scott Schluter (Libertarian) 2.7%
Iowa	Kim Reynolds	Republican	2017 (Note: Reynolds took office after her predecessor (Terry Branstad) resigned. She was subsequently elected in the 2018 Iowa gubernatorial election.)	Incumbent re-elected.	▌ ✓ Kim Reynolds (Republican) 58.0%; ▌Deidre DeJear (Democratic) 39.5%; ▌Rick Stewart (Libertarian) 2.4%
Kansas	Laura Kelly	Democratic	2018	Incumbent re-elected.	▌ ✓ Laura Kelly (Democratic) 49.5%; ▌Derek Schmidt (Republican) 47.3%; ▌Dennis Pyle (Independent) 2.0%; ▌Seth Cordell (Libertarian) 1.1%
Maine	Janet Mills	Democratic	2018	Incumbent re-elected.	▌ ✓ Janet Mills (Democratic) 55.7%; ▌Paul LePage (Republican) 42.4%; ▌Sam Hunkler (Independent) 1.9%
Maryland	Larry Hogan	Republican	2014	Incumbent term-limited. Democratic gain.	▌ ✓ Wes Moore (Democratic) 64.5%; ▌Dan Cox (Republican) 32.1%; Others: ▌David Lashar (Libertarian) 1.5%; ▌David Harding (Working Class) 0.9%; ▌Nancy Wallace (Green) 0.7%
Massachusetts	Charlie Baker	Republican	2014	Incumbent retired. Democratic gain.	▌ ✓ Maura Healey (Democratic) 63.7%; ▌Geoff Diehl (Republican) 34.6%; ▌Kevin Reed (Libertarian) 1.6%
Michigan	Gretchen Whitmer	Democratic	2018	Incumbent re-elected.	▌ ✓ Gretchen Whitmer (Democratic) 54.5%; ▌Tudor Dixon (Republican) 43.9%; Others: ▌Mary Buzuma (Libertarian) 0.9%; ▌Donna Brandenburg (U.S. Taxpayers) 0.4%; ▌Kevin Hogan (Green) 0.2%; ▌Daryl Simpson (Natural Law) 0.1%
Minnesota	Tim Walz	DFL	2018	Incumbent re-elected.	▌ ✓ Tim Walz (DFL) 52.3%; ▌Scott Jensen (Republican) 44.6%; Others: ▌James McCaskel (Legal Marijuana Now) 1.2%; ▌Steve Patterson (GLC) 0.9%; ▌Hugh McTavish (IPM–Alliance) 0.7%; ▌Gabrielle Prosser (Socialist Workers) 0.3%
Nebraska	Pete Ricketts	Republican	2014	Incumbent term-limited. Republican hold.	▌ ✓ Jim Pillen (Republican) 59.7%; ▌Carol Blood (Democratic) 36.3%; ▌Scott Zimmerman (Libertarian) 4.0%
Nevada	Steve Sisolak	Democratic	2018	Incumbent lost re-election. Republican gain.	▌ ✓ Joe Lombardo (Republican) 48.8%; ▌Steve Sisolak (Democratic) 47.3%; Others: ▌Brandon Davis (Libertarian) 1.5%; ▌None of These Candidates 1.5%; ▌Ed Bridges (Independent American) 1.0%
New Hampshire	Chris Sununu	Republican	2016	Incumbent re-elected.	▌ ✓ Chris Sununu (Republican) 57.1%; ▌Tom Sherman (Democratic) 41.6%; Others: ▌Kelly Halldorson (Libertarian) 0.8%; ▌Karlyn Borysenko (Libertarian) 0.5%
New Mexico	Michelle Lujan Grisham	Democratic	2018	Incumbent re-elected.	▌ ✓ Michelle Lujan Grisham (Democratic) 52.0%; ▌Mark Ronchetti (Republican) 45.6%; ▌Karen Bedonie (Libertarian) 2.4%
New York	Kathy Hochul	Democratic	2021 (Note: Hochul took office after her predecessor (Andrew Cuomo) resigned.)	Incumbent elected to full term.	▌ ✓ Kathy Hochul (Democratic) 53.2%; ▌Lee Zeldin (Republican) 46.8%
Ohio	Mike DeWine	Republican	2018	Incumbent re-elected.	▌ ✓ Mike DeWine (Republican) 62.4%; ▌Nan Whaley (Democratic) 37.4%
Oklahoma	Kevin Stitt	Republican	2018	Incumbent re-elected.	▌ ✓ Kevin Stitt (Republican) 55.4%; ▌Joy Hofmeister (Democratic) 41.8%; ▌Natalie Bruno (Libertarian) 1.4%; ▌Ervin Yen (Independent) 1.4%
Oregon	Kate Brown	Democratic	2015 (Note: Brown took office after her predecessor (John Kitzhaber) resigned. She was subsequently elected in the 2016 Oregon gubernatorial special election.)	Incumbent term-limited. Democratic hold.	▌ ✓ Tina Kotek (Democratic) 47.0%; ▌Christine Drazan (Republican) 43.6%; ▌Betsy Johnson (Independent) 8.6%; Others: ▌Donice Smith (Constitution) 0.4%; ▌R. Leon Noble (Libertarian) 0.4%
Pennsylvania	Tom Wolf	Democratic	2014	Incumbent term-limited Democratic hold.	▌ ✓ Josh Shapiro (Democratic) 56.5%; ▌Doug Mastriano (Republican) 41.7%; Others: ▌Matt Hackenburg (Libertarian) 1.0%; ▌Christina DiGiulio (Green) 0.5%; ▌Joe Soloski (Keystone) 0.4%
Rhode Island	Dan McKee	Democratic	2021 (Note: McKee took office in 2021 after his predecessor (Gina Raimondo) resigned.)	Incumbent elected to full term.	▌ ✓ Dan McKee (Democratic) 57.9%; ▌Ashley Kalus (Republican) 38.9%; Others: ▌Zachary Hurwitz (Independent) 1.3%; ▌Paul Rianna Jr. (Independent) 0.9%; ▌Elijah Gizzarelli (Libertarian) 0.8%
South Carolina	Henry McMaster	Republican	2017 (Note: McMaster took office after his predecessor (Nikki Haley) resigned. He was subsequently elected in the 2018 South Carolina gubernatorial election.)	Incumbent re-elected.	▌ ✓ Henry McMaster (Republican) 58.1%; ▌Joe Cunningham (Democratic) 40.7%; ▌Bruce Reeves (Libertarian) 1.2%
South Dakota	Kristi Noem	Republican	2018	Incumbent re-elected.	▌ ✓ Kristi Noem (Republican) 62.0%; ▌Jamie Smith (Democratic) 35.2%; ▌Tracey Quint (Libertarian) 2.9%
Tennessee	Bill Lee	Republican	2018	Incumbent re-elected.	▌ ✓ Bill Lee (Republican) 64.9%; ▌Jason Martin (Democratic) 32.9%; Others: ▌John Gentry (Independent) 0.9%; ▌Constance Every (Independent) 0.6%; ▌Deborah Rouse (Independent) 0.2%; ▌Rick Tyler (Independent) 0.1%; ▌Charles Morgan (Independent) 0.1%; ▌Basil Marceaux (Independent) 0.1%; ▌Alfred O'Neil (Independent) 0.1%; ▌Michael Scantland (Independent) 0.1%
Texas	Greg Abbott	Republican	2014	Incumbent re-elected.	▌ ✓ Greg Abbott (Republican) 54.8%; ▌Beto O'Rourke (Democratic) 43.9%; ▌Mark Tippetts (Libertarian) 1.0%; ▌Delilah Barrios (Green) 0.4%
Vermont	Phil Scott	Republican	2016	Incumbent re-elected.	▌ ✓ Phil Scott (Republican) 70.9%; ▌Brenda Siegel (Democratic) 23.9%; Others: ▌Kevin Hoyt (Independent) 2.1%; ▌Peter Duval (Independent) 1.6%; ▌Bernard Peters (Independent) 0.8%
Wisconsin	Tony Evers	Democratic	2018	Incumbent re-elected.	▌ ✓ Tony Evers (Democratic) 51.2%; ▌Tim Michels (Republican) 47.8%; ▌Joan Ellis Beglinger (Independent) 1.0%
Wyoming	Mark Gordon	Republican	2018	Incumbent re-elected.	▌ ✓ Mark Gordon (Republican) 74.1%; ▌Theresa Livingston (Democratic) 15.8%; ▌Jared Baldes (Libertarian) 4.2%

=== Territories and federal district ===
Territory	Governor	Party	First elected	Status	Candidates
District of Columbia	Muriel Bowser	Democratic	2014	Incumbent re-elected.	▌ ✓ Muriel Bowser (Democratic) 74.7%; ▌Red Grant (Independent) 14.9%; ▌Stacia Hall (Republican) 5.9%; ▌Dennis Sobin (Libertarian) 1.3%
Guam	Lou Leon Guerrero	Democratic	2018	Incumbent re-elected.	▌ ✓ Lou Leon Guerrero (Democratic) 55.5%; ▌Felix Camacho (Republican) 44.1%
Northern Mariana Islands	Ralph Torres	Republican	2015 (Note: Torres took office after his predecessor (Eloy Inos) died. He was subsequently elected in the 2018 Northern Mariana Islands gubernatorial election.)	Incumbent lost re-election. New governor elected. Independent gain.	First round: ▌ Ralph Torres (Republican) 38.8%; ▌ Arnold Palacios (Independent) 33.2%; ▌Tina Sablan (Democratic) 28.0%; Runoff: ▌ ✓ Arnold Palacios (Independent) 54.1%; ▌Ralph Torres (Republican) 45.9%
U.S. Virgin Islands	Albert Bryan	Democratic	2018	Incumbent re-elected.	▌ ✓ Albert Bryan (Democratic) 56.0%; ▌Kurt Vialet (Independent) 38.2%; ▌Stephen Frett (Independent Citizens Movement) 3.4%; ▌Ronald Pickard (Independent) 1.1%

== Closest races ==
States where the margin of victory was under 1%:

1. Arizona, 0.66%

States where the margin of victory was under 5%:

1. Nevada, 1.51%
2. Kansas, 2.21%
3. Wisconsin, 3.40%
4. Oregon, 3.42%

States where the margin of victory was under 10%:

1. New Mexico, 6.38%
2. New York, 6.40%
3. Georgia, 7.54%
4. Minnesota, 7.67%
5. Northern Mariana Islands, 8.28%

Blue denotes races won by Democrats. Red denotes races won by Republicans. Grey denotes races won by Independents.

== Alabama ==
2022 Alabama gubernatorial election
- November 8, 2022
- Turnout: 38.50% ▼
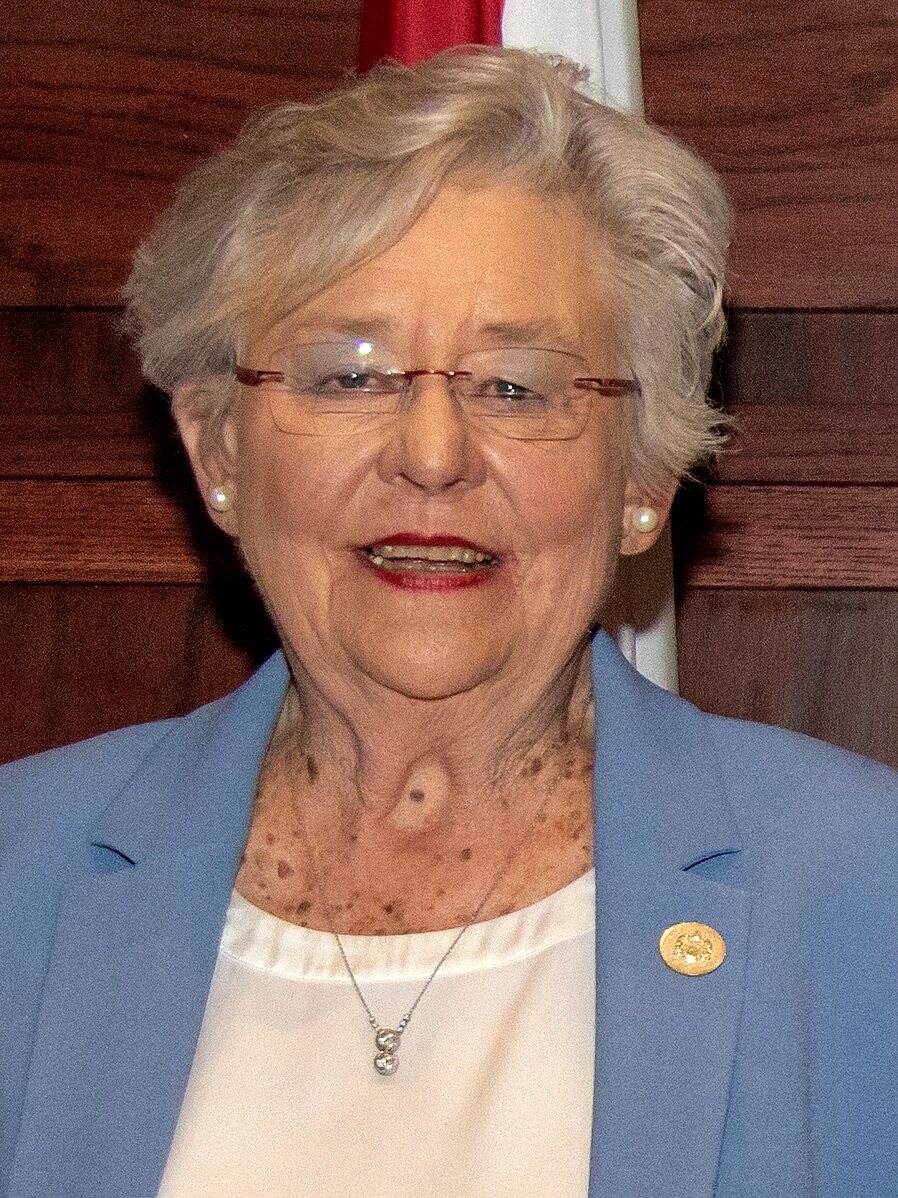
Nominee	Kay Ivey	Yolanda Flowers
Party	Republican	Democratic
Popular vote	946,932	412,961
Percentage	66.91%	29.18%
- Ivey: 40–50% 50–60% 60–70% 70–80% 80–90% >90% Flowers: 40–50% 50–60% 60–70% 70–80% 80–90% >90%
Governor before election
Kay Ivey
Republican
Elected Governor
Kay Ivey
Republican

Incumbent Republican governor Kay Ivey took office on April 10, 2017, upon the resignation of former governor Robert J. Bentley, and was elected to a full term in 2018. She ran for re-election to a second full term and won in a landslide.

Primary elections in Alabama were held on May 24. Runoff elections for instances where no candidate received 50% plus one vote were scheduled for June 21. A runoff was avoided in the Republican primary, with Ivey winning outright. The Democratic primary advanced to a runoff between Malika Sanders-Fortier and Yolanda Flowers, with Flowers winning the Democratic nomination.

This was the first gubernatorial election in Alabama history in which both major party nominees were women. Flowers was also the first Black female gubernatorial nominee in Alabama. Governor Ivey was re-elected and sworn in for her second full term on January 16, 2023.

This is the only gubernatorial election in the 2020s to be won by a member of the Silent Generation.

Republican primary results
Party	Candidate	Votes	%
Republican	Kay Ivey (incumbent)	357,069	54.45%
Republican	Lynda Blanchard	126,202	19.25%
Republican	Tim James	106,181	16.19%
Republican	Lew Burdette	42,924	6.55%
Republican	Dean Odle	11,767	1.79%
Republican	Donald Trent Jones	3,821	0.58%
Republican	Dave Thomas	2,886	0.44%
Republican	Stacy Lee George	2,546	0.39%
Republican	Dean Young	2,356	0.36%
Total votes		655,752	100.0%

Democratic primary results
Party	Candidate	Votes	%
Democratic	Yolanda Rochelle Flowers	56,991	33.88%
Democratic	Malika Sanders-Fortier	54,699	32.52%
Democratic	Patricia Jamieson Salter	19,691	11.71%
Democratic	Arthur Kennedy	15,630	9.29%
Democratic	Doug Smith	11,861	7.05%
Democratic	Chad Martin	9,352	5.56%
Total votes		168,224	100.0%

Democratic primary runoff results
Party	Candidate	Votes	%
Democratic	Yolanda Rochelle Flowers	32,529	55.14%
Democratic	Malika Sanders-Fortier	26,469	44.86%
Total votes		58,998	100.0%

2022 Alabama Gubernatorial Election
Party	Candidate	Votes	%	±%
Republican	Kay Ivey (incumbent)	946,932	66.91%	+7.45%
Democratic	Yolanda Rochelle Flowers	412,961	29.18%	−11.21%
Libertarian	James D. "Jimmy" Blake	45,958	3.25%	N/A
Write-in		9,432	0.67%	+0.52%
Total votes		1,411,756	100%	
Turnout		1,419,718	38.50%	
Registered electors		3,687,753		
Republican hold				

== Alaska ==
Alaska gubernatorial election
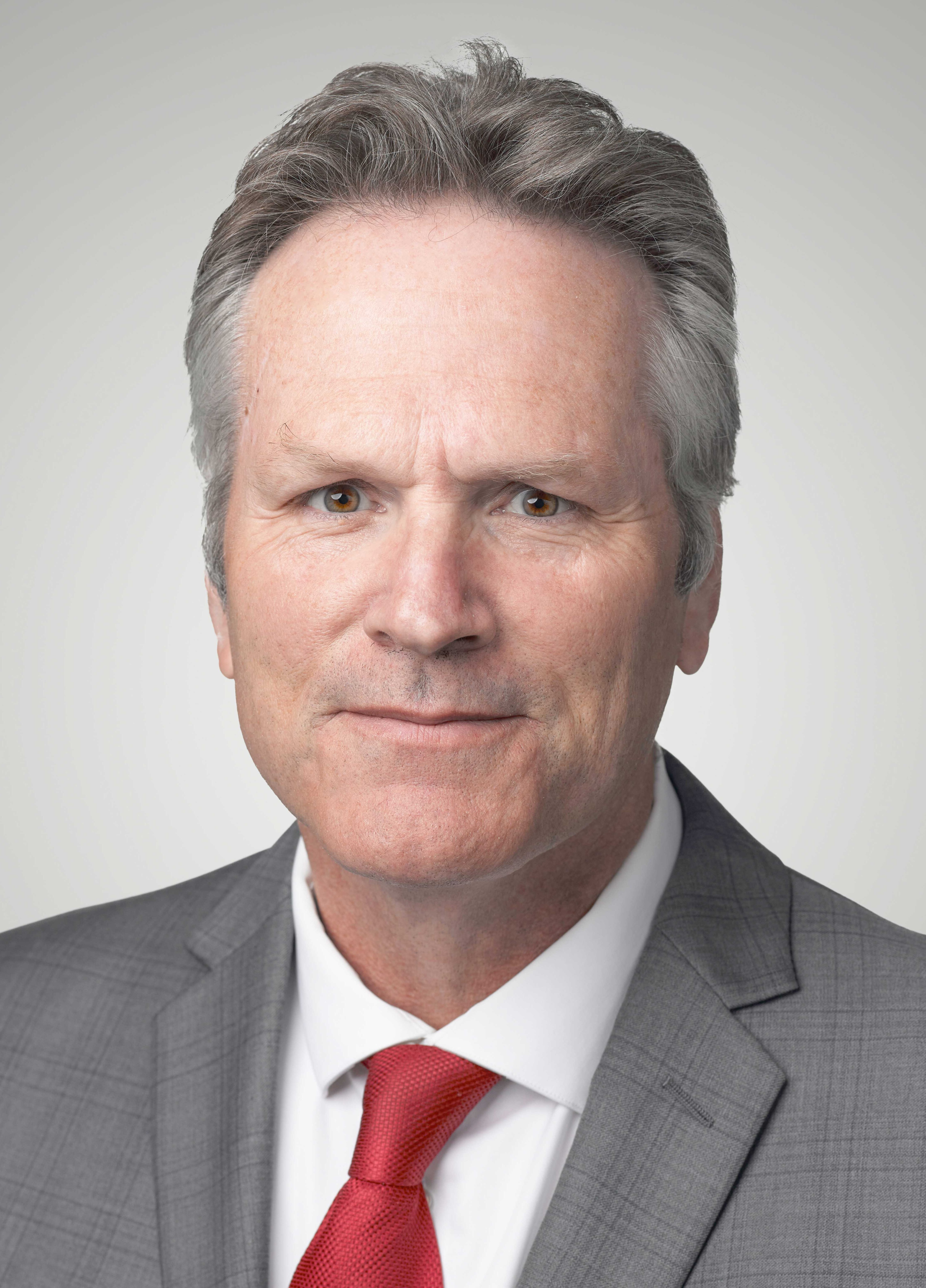

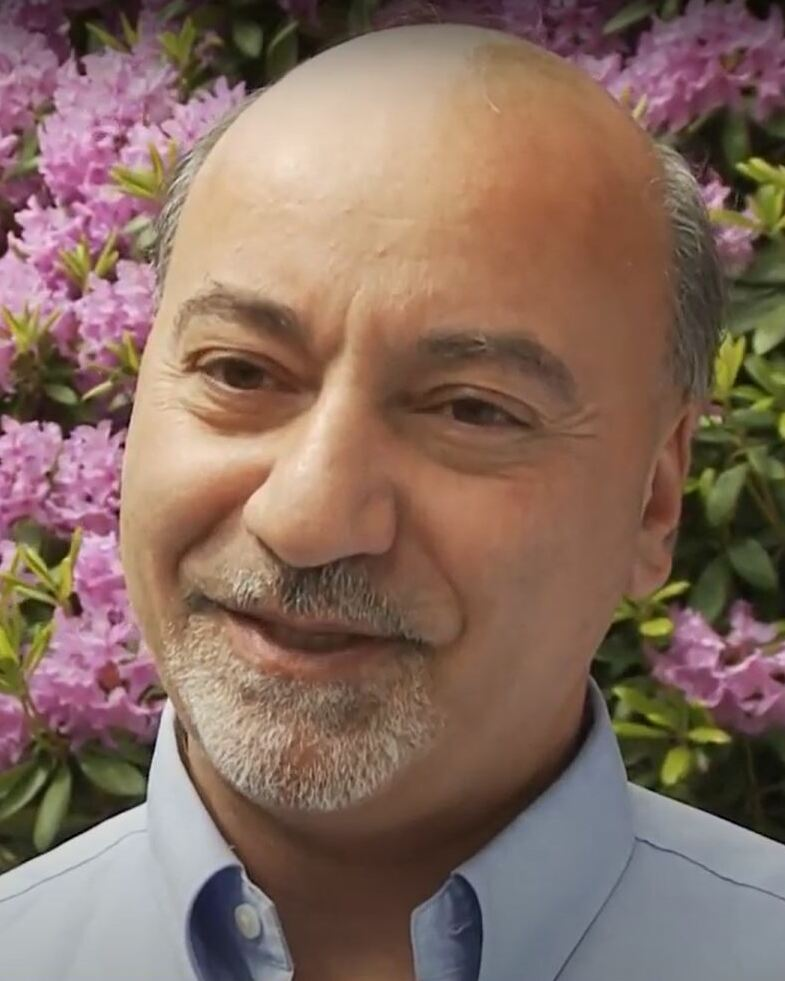

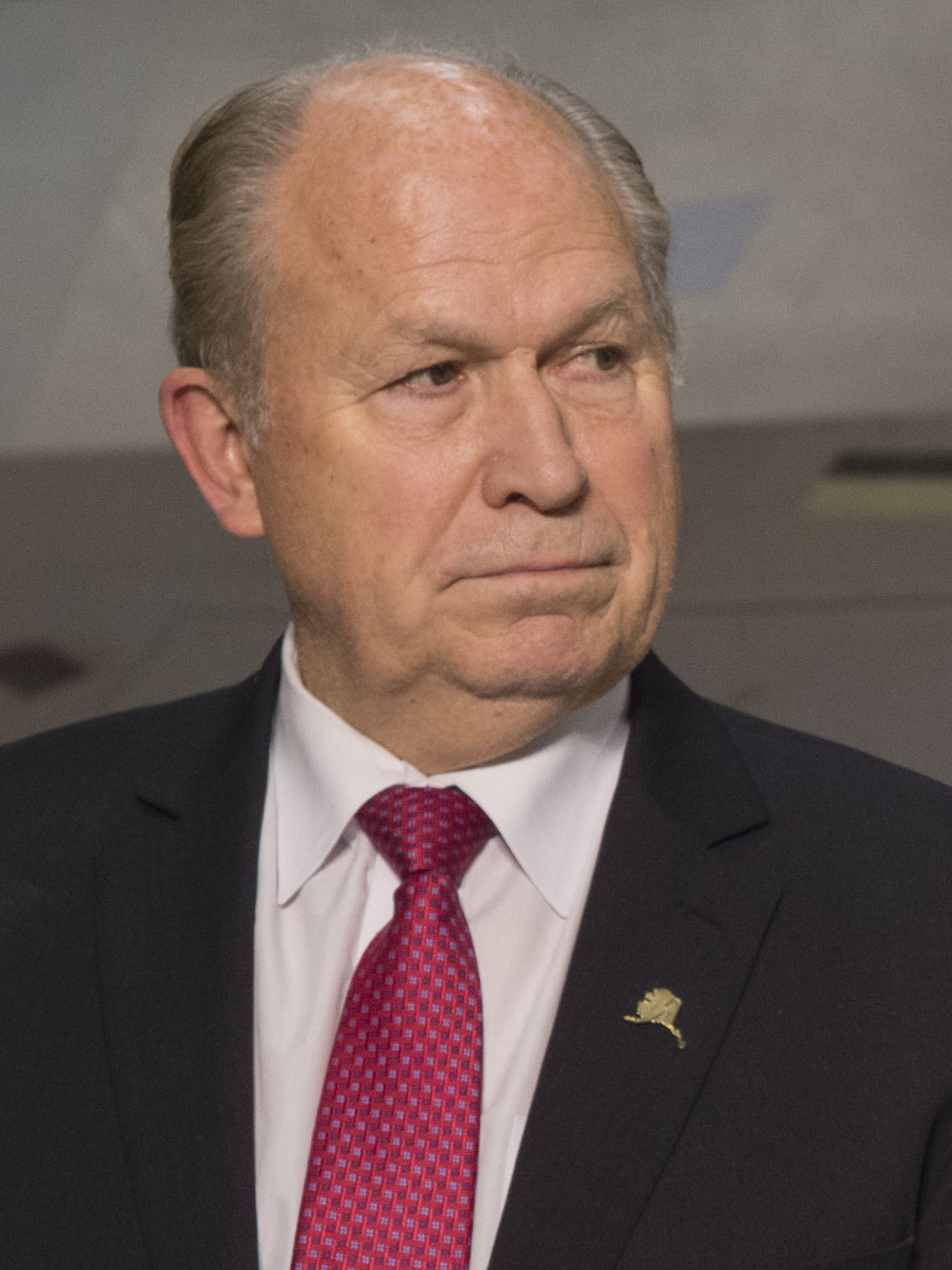
Candidate	Mike Dunleavy	Les Gara	Bill Walker
Party	Republican	Democratic	Independent
Running mate	Nancy Dahlstrom	Jessica Cook	Heidi Drygas
Popular vote	132,632	63,851	54,668
Percentage	50.3%	24.2%	20.7%
- Dunleavy: 30–40% 40–50% 50–60% 60–70% 70–80% Gara: 40–50% Walker: 30–40% 40–50%
Governor before election
Mike Dunleavy
Republican
Elected Governor
Mike Dunleavy
Republican

Incumbent Republican governor Mike Dunleavy won re-election to a second term, becoming the first Republican governor to be re-elected to a second term since Jay Hammond in 1978 and the first governor, regardless of political affiliation, to be re-elected to a second term since Tony Knowles in 1998.

Primary election results
Party	Candidate	Votes	%
Republican	Mike Dunleavy (incumbent); Nancy Dahlstrom	76,534	40.43
Democratic	Les Gara; Jessica Cook	43,660	23.06
Independent	Bill Walker; Heidi Drygas	43,111	22.77
Republican	Charlie Pierce; Edie Grunwald	12,458	6.58
Republican	Christopher Kurka; Paul Hueper	7,307	3.86
Independence	John Howe; Shellie Wyatt	1,702	0.90
Republican	Bruce Walden; Tanya Lange	1,661	0.88
Libertarian	William S. Toien; Shirley Rainbolt	1,381	0.73
Republican	David Haeg; Waynette Coleman	1,139	0.60
Independent	William Nemec; Ronnie Ostrem	347	0.18
Total votes		188,626	100.00

2022 Alaska gubernatorial election
Party	Candidate	Votes	%	±%
Republican	Mike Dunleavy (incumbent); Nancy Dahlstrom	132,632	50.29%	−1.15%
Democratic	Les Gara; Jessica Cook	63,851	24.21%	−20.20%
Independent	Bill Walker; Heidi Drygas	54,668	20.73%	+18.70%
Republican	Charlie Pierce; Edie Grunwald (withdrew) (Note: Suspended her campaign and endorsed Dunleavy on October 25, 2022 after allegations of sexual harassment against Pierce but remained on the ballot.)	11,817	4.48%	N/A
Write-in		784	0.30%	+0.09%
Total votes		263,752	100.0%	
Turnout		266,472	44.33%	−5.49%
Registered electors		601,161		
Republican hold				

== Arizona ==
Arizona gubernatorial election
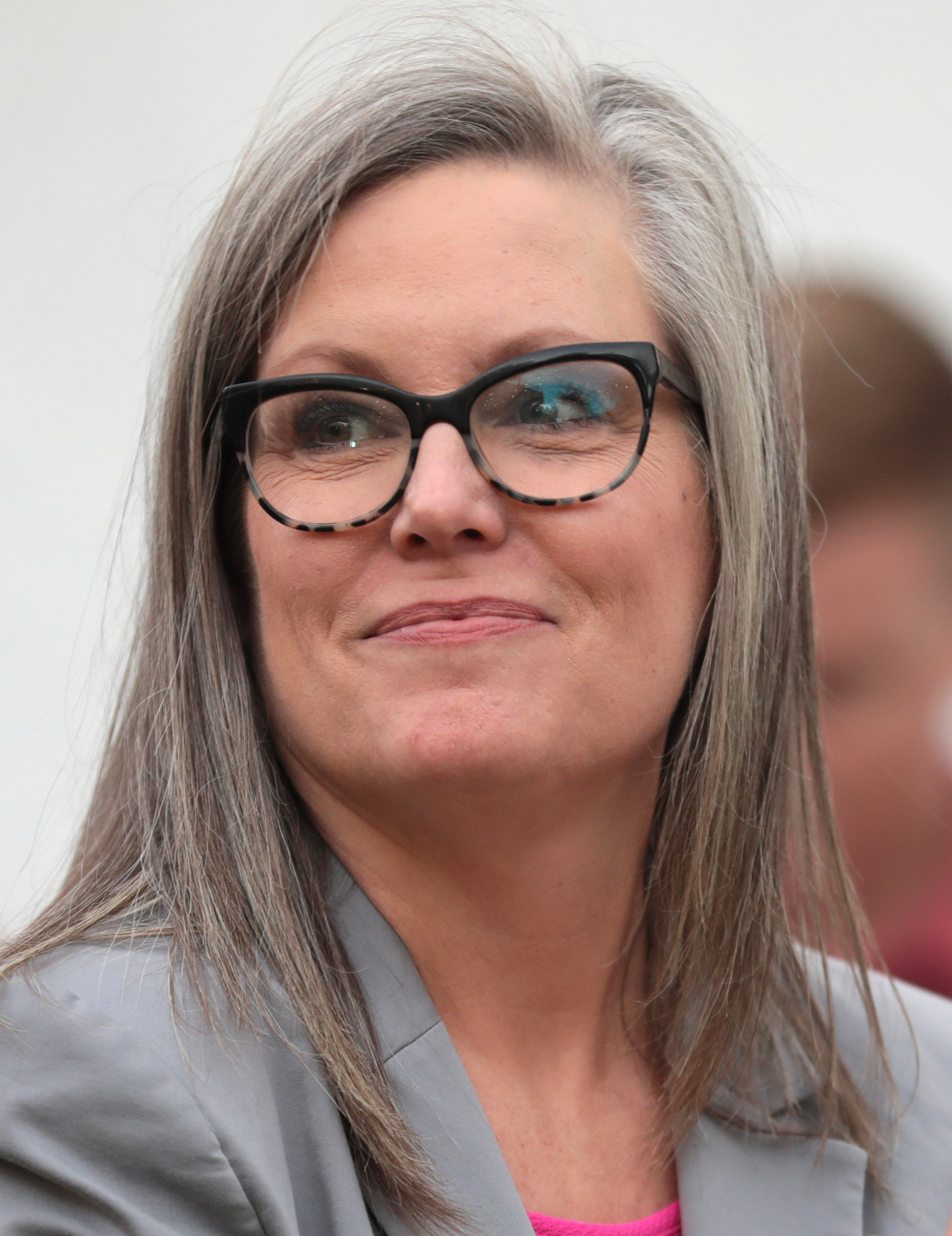

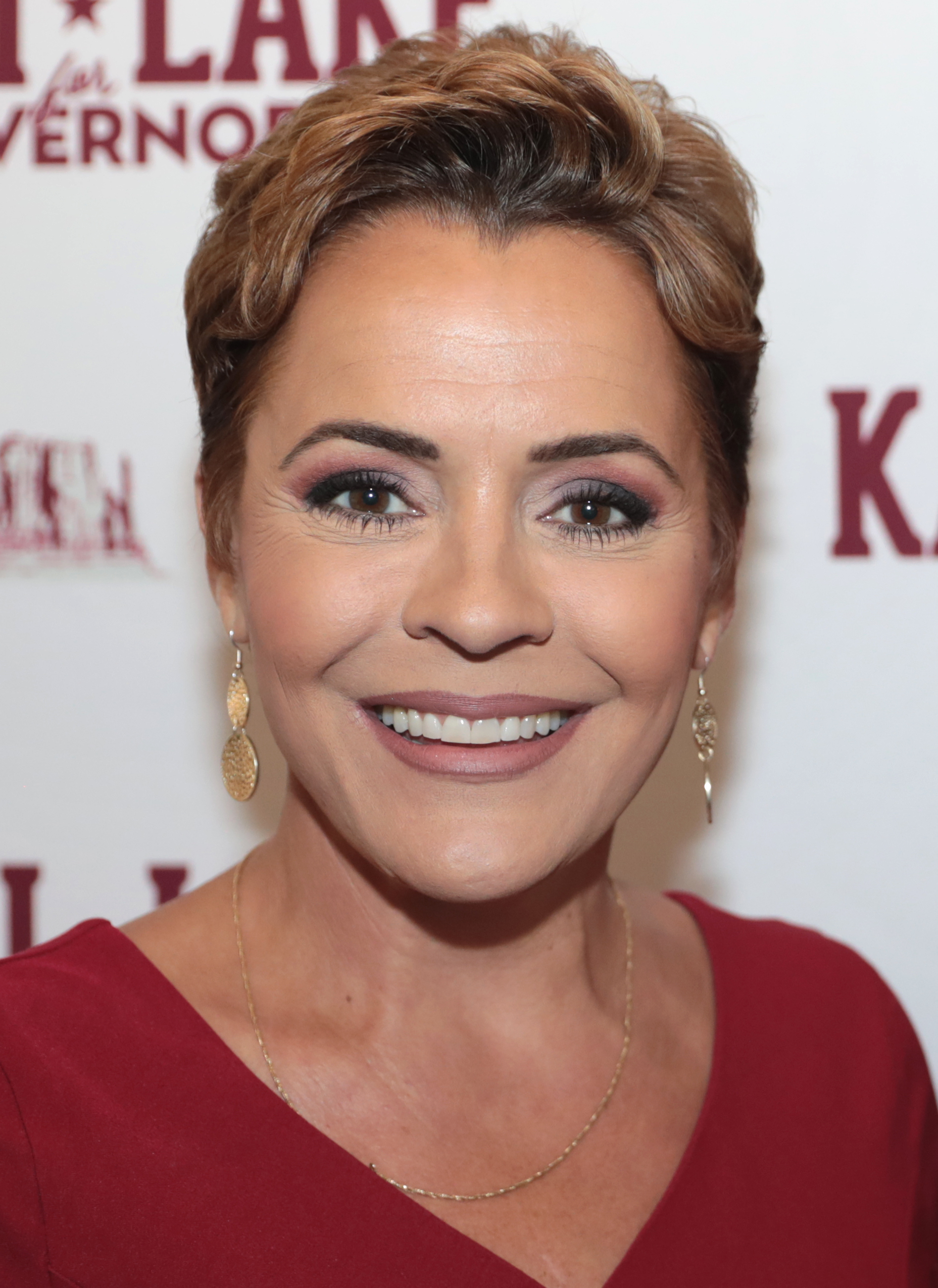
Nominee	Katie Hobbs	Kari Lake
Party	Democratic	Republican
Popular vote	1,287,891	1,270,774
Percentage	50.3%	49.7%
- County results Hobbs: 50–60% 60–70% Lake: 50–60% 60–70% 70–80%
Governor before election
Doug Ducey
Republican
Elected Governor
Katie Hobbs
Democratic

Incumbent Republican governor Doug Ducey was term-limited and ineligible to run for a third consecutive term. Democratic Arizona Secretary of State Katie Hobbs won the election against Republican former television anchor Kari Lake.

Primaries were held on August 2 for both parties, with Lake winning the Republican nomination and Hobbs winning the Democratic nomination, making this the first gubernatorial election in Arizona history in which both major party candidates for governor were women. Hobbs became the fifth female governor of Arizona, with Arizona setting a record for the most female governors in American history. With the concurrent passage of Proposition 131, this will be the last gubernatorial election in Arizona without a lieutenant governor on the ticket.

Going into the election, most polling had Lake leading and analysts generally considered the race to either be a tossup or leaning towards the Republican. Nonetheless, Hobbs ultimately defeated Lake with 50.32% of the vote, becoming the first Democrat elected governor of Arizona since Janet Napolitano in 2006. Lake refused to concede and filed a post-election lawsuit in an attempt to overturn the results, with all her claims either being dismissed or ruled against for lack of evidence.

This race was one of six Republican-held governorships up for election in 2022 taking place in a state that was carried by Democrat Joe Biden in the 2020 presidential election. With a margin of 0.67%, it was the closest election of the 2022 gubernatorial election cycle.

Republican primary results
Party	Candidate	Votes	%
Republican	Kari Lake	398,860	47.97%
Republican	Karrin Taylor Robson	358,662	43.13%
Republican	Matt Salmon (withdrawn)	30,704	3.69%
Republican	Scott Neely	25,876	3.11%
Republican	Paola Tulliani-Zen	17,281	2.08%
Write-in		105	0.01%
Total votes		831,508	100.0%

Democratic primary results
Party	Candidate	Votes	%
Democratic	Katie Hobbs	431,059	72.32%
Democratic	Marco A. López Jr.	136,090	22.83%
Democratic	Aaron Lieberman (withdrawn)	28,878	4.85%
Total votes		596,027	100.0%

2022 Arizona gubernatorial election
Party	Candidate	Votes	%	±%
Democratic	Katie Hobbs	1,287,891	50.32%	+8.48%
Republican	Kari Lake	1,270,774	49.65%	−6.35%
Write-in		820	0.03%	+0.01%
Total votes		2,559,485	100.0%	
Turnout		2,592,313	62.56%	
Registered electors		4,143,929		
Democratic gain from Republican				

== Arkansas ==
Arkansas gubernatorial election
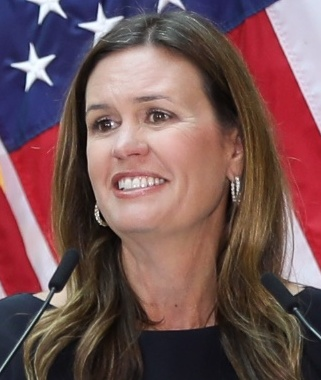

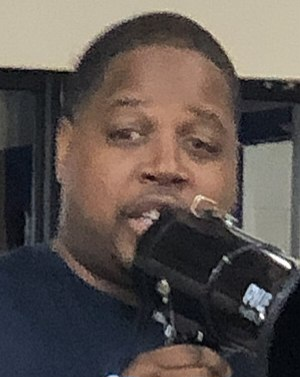
Nominee	Sarah Huckabee Sanders	Chris Jones
Party	Republican	Democratic
Popular vote	571,105	319,242
Percentage	63.0%	35.2%
- County results Sanders: 40–50% 50–60% 60–70% 70–80% 80–90% Jones: 40–50% 50–60% 60–70%
Governor before election
Asa Hutchinson
Republican
Elected Governor
Sarah Huckabee Sanders
Republican

Incumbent Republican governor Asa Hutchinson was term-limited and could not seek a third term. Arkansas is one of the nine states and one territory of the United States that limit governors to two terms for life in their constitutions, along with California, Delaware, Michigan, Mississippi, Missouri, Nevada, North Dakota, the Northern Mariana Islands, and Oklahoma. Sarah Huckabee Sanders was sworn in on January 10, 2023.

Primary elections in Arkansas were held on May 24. Runoff elections for instances where no candidate receives over 50% of the vote were scheduled for June 21. Former White House press secretary Sarah Huckabee Sanders won the Republican nomination, while Chris Jones won the Democratic nomination.

Leading up to the Republican primary, Sanders received many endorsements from key Republican figures, including Donald Trump, Mike Pence, incumbent Asa Hutchinson, Arkansas' entire U.S. Congressional delegation, and dozens of GOP representatives from the State House and State Senate. She cruised to a landslide victory in the primary, and as Arkansas is a GOP stronghold, her victory virtually guaranteed she would win the general election, in which she defeated Jones by 28 points. Jones became the first Democrat to win Washington County since 2010, and Sanders became the first Republican to win majority-Black Crittenden County since her father in 1998. This is the first time ever that a Republican won three straight gubernatorial elections in the state's history.

Sanders became the first female governor of Arkansas, as well as the first daughter of a former governor to take office in United States history. In addition, with the election of Leslie Rutledge as lieutenant governor, Arkansas, along with Massachusetts, became the first two U.S. states to have both a female governor and female lieutenant governor serving at the same time.

Republican primary results
Party	Candidate	Votes	%
Republican	Sarah Huckabee Sanders	289,249	83.14%
Republican	Francis "Doc" Washburn	58,638	16.86%
Total votes		347,887	100.0%

Democratic primary results
Party	Candidate	Votes	%
Democratic	Chris Jones	66,540	70.43%
Democratic	Anthony Bland	9,055	9.58%
Democratic	Jay Martin	7,731	8.18%
Democratic	James "Rus" Russell	6,421	6.80%
Democratic	Supha Xayprasith-Mays	4,725	5.00%
Total votes		94,472	100.0%

2022 Arkansas gubernatorial election
Party	Candidate	Votes	%	±%
Republican	Sarah Huckabee Sanders	571,105	62.96%	−2.37%
Democratic	Chris Jones	319,242	35.20%	+3.43%
Libertarian	Ricky Dale Harrington Jr.	16,690	1.84%	−1.06%
Total votes		907,037	100.00%	N/A
Turnout		907,037	50.81%	
Registered electors		1,799,136		
Republican hold				

== California ==
California gubernatorial election
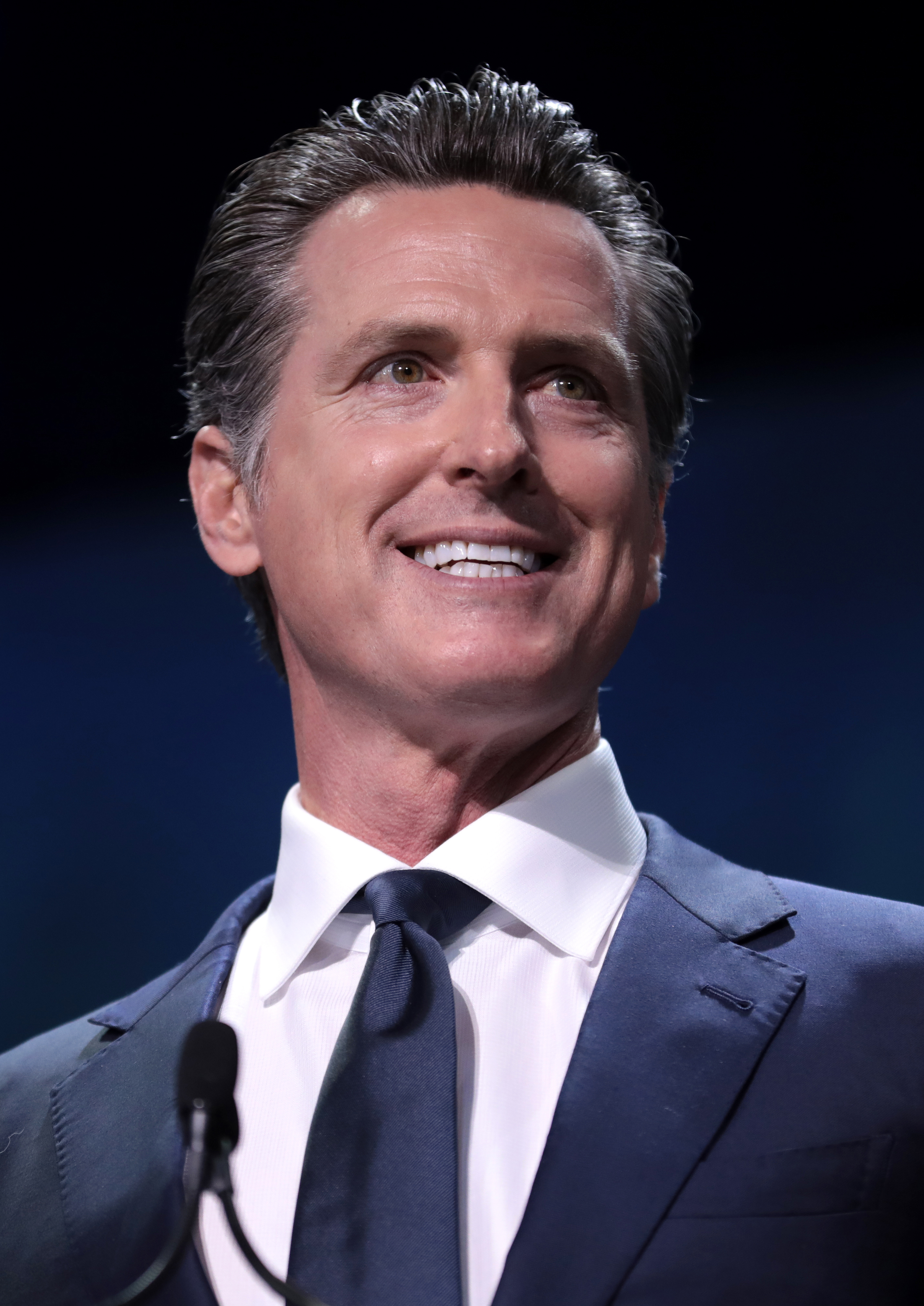

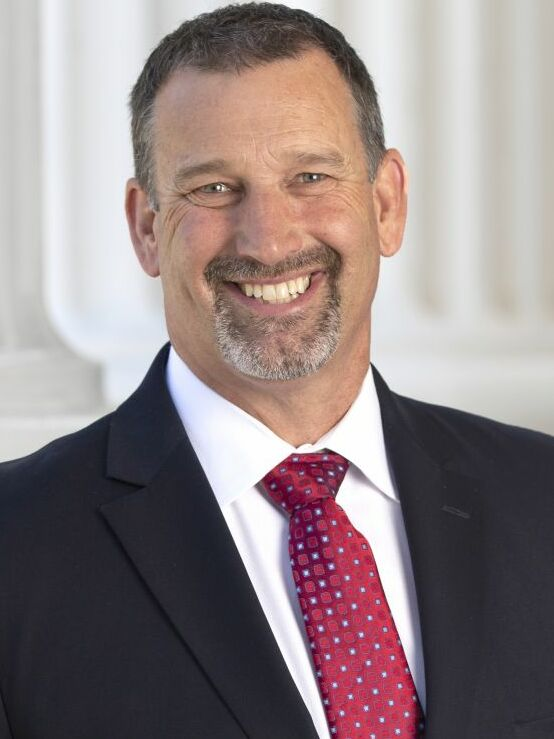
Candidate	Gavin Newsom	Brian Dahle
Party	Democratic	Republican
Popular vote	6,470,104	4,462,914
Percentage	59.2%	40.8%
- County results Newsom: 50–60% 60–70% 70–80% 80–90% Dahle: 50–60% 60–70% 70–80% 80–90%
Governor before election
Gavin Newsom
Democratic
Elected Governor
Gavin Newsom
Democratic

Incumbent Democratic Party Governor Gavin Newsom ran and won re-election to a second term after surviving a recall election in 2021, during his first term.

The elections featured universal mail-in ballots; in-person voting was also available. All statewide elected offices are currently held by Democrats. Newsom won 61.9% of the vote in both the 2018 gubernatorial election and the 2021 recall election. He received 55.9% of the top-two primary vote and faced Republican Party state senator Brian Dahle, who received 17.7% of the primary vote, in the general election. Newsom easily won re-election with 59.2% of the vote to Dahle's 40.8%, but with a smaller margin of victory than in 2018. Dahle flipped five counties that Newsom carried in 2018, namely Lake, Merced (although Merced voted to recall Newsom), Orange, San Bernardino, and San Joaquin. Dahle received 32% of the vote in Los Angeles County, a respectable performance for a Republican in the Democratic stronghold.

Primary results
Party	Candidate	Votes	%
Democratic	Gavin Newsom (incumbent)	3,945,728	55.9
Republican	Brian Dahle	1,252,800	17.7
No party preference	Michael Shellenberger	290,286	4.1
Republican	Jenny Rae Le Roux	246,665	3.5
Republican	Anthony Trimino	246,322	3.5
Republican	Shawn Collins	173,083	2.5
Green	Luis J. Rodriguez	124,672	1.8
Republican	Leo S. Zacky	94,521	1.3
Republican	Major Williams	92,580	1.3
Republican	Robert C. Newman II	82,849	1.2
Democratic	Joel Ventresca	66,885	0.9
Republican	David Lozano	66,542	0.9
Republican	Ronald A. Anderson	53,554	0.8
No party preference	Reinette Senum	53,015	0.8
Democratic	Armando Perez-Serrato	45,474	0.6
Republican	Ron Jones	38,337	0.5
Republican	Daniel R. Mercuri	36,396	0.5
Green	Heather Collins	29,690	0.4
Democratic	Anthony Fanara	25,086	0.4
Republican	Cristian Raul Morales	22,304	0.3
Republican	Lonnie Sortor	21,044	0.3
No party preference	Frederic C. Schultz	17,502	0.2
No party preference	Woodrow Sanders III	16,204	0.2
No party preference	James G. Hanink	10,110	0.1
No party preference	Serge Fiankan	6,201	0.1
No party preference	Bradley Zink	5,997	0.1
American Independent	Jeff Scott (write-in)	13	0.0
Republican	Gurinder Bhangoo (write-in)	8	0.0
Total votes		7,063,868	100.0

2022 California gubernatorial election
Party	Candidate	Votes	%	±%
Democratic	Gavin Newsom (incumbent)	6,470,104	59.18%	−2.77%
Republican	Brian Dahle	4,462,914	40.82%	+2.77%
Total votes		10,933,018	100.0%	N/A
Turnout		10,933,018	50.80%	
Registered electors		21,940,274		
Democratic hold				

== Colorado ==
Colorado gubernatorial election
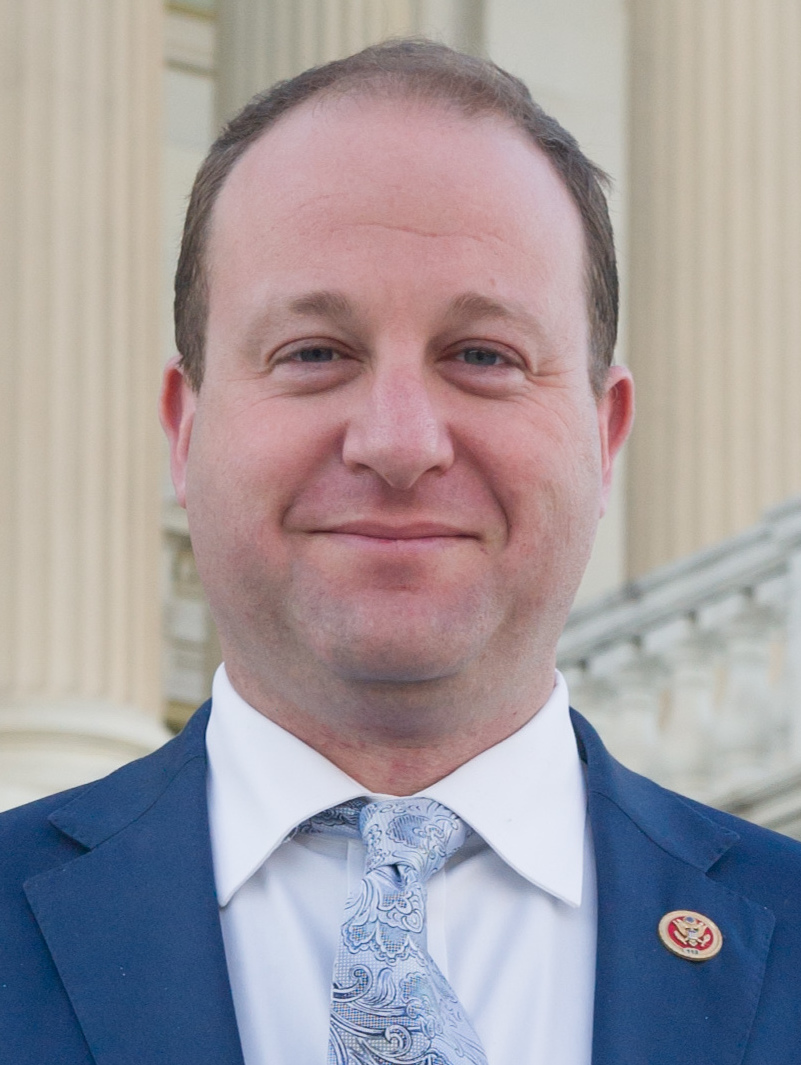

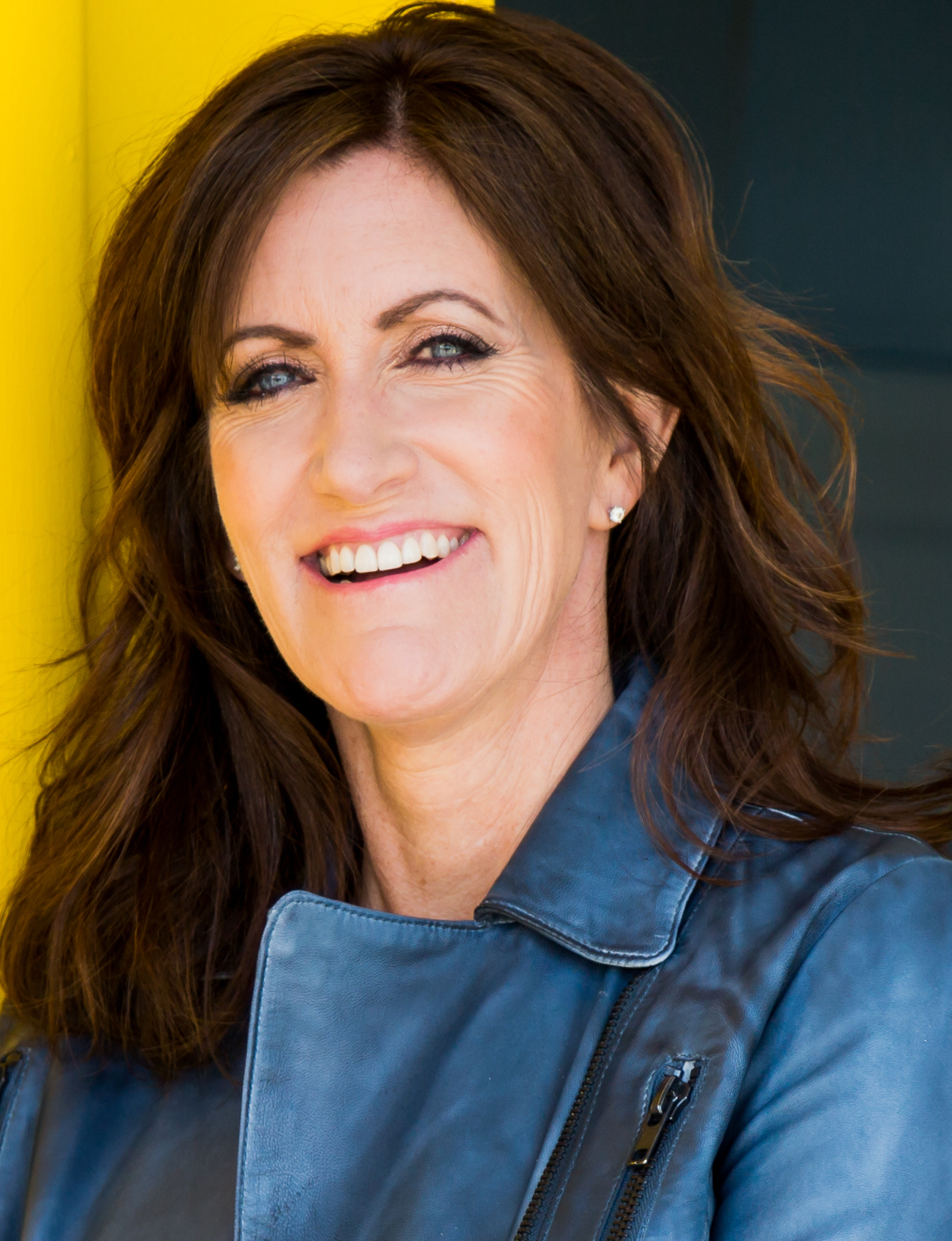
Nominee	Jared Polis	Heidi Ganahl
Party	Democratic	Republican
Running mate	Dianne Primavera	Danny Moore
Popular vote	1,468,481	983,040
Percentage	58.5%	39.2%
- County results Polis: 40–50% 50–60% 60–70% 70–80% 80–90% Ganahl: 40–50% 50–60% 60–70% 70–80% 80–90%
Governor before election
Jared Polis
Democratic
Elected Governor
Jared Polis
Democratic

Incumbent Democratic governor Jared Polis won re-election to a second term, defeating Republican University of Colorado regent Heidi Ganahl. The primary election was held on June 28.

Polis's 2022 victory marked the first time in American history that an openly gay politician was re-elected governor of a state. Polis had the best performance for a re-elected Colorado governor since Bill Owens in 2002, the best for a Democrat since Roy Romer in 1990, and the highest raw vote total ever in a Colorado gubernatorial race.

Democratic primary results
Party	Candidate	Votes	%
Democratic	Jared Polis (incumbent)	523,489	100.00%
Total votes		523,489	100.00%

Republican primary results
Party	Candidate	Votes	%
Republican	Heidi Ganahl	341,157	53.87%
Republican	Greg Lopez	292,187	46.13%
Total votes		633,344	100.0%

2022 Colorado gubernatorial election
Party	Candidate	Votes	%	±%
Democratic	Jared Polis (incumbent); Dianne Primavera (incumbent)	1,468,481	58.53%	+5.11%
Republican	Heidi Ganahl; Danny Moore	983,040	39.18%	−3.62%
Libertarian	Kevin Ruskusky; Michele Poague	28,939	1.15%	−1.60%
American Constitution	Danielle Neuschwanger; Darryl Gibbs	21,623	0.86%	N/A
Unity	Paul Noel Fiorino; Cynthia Munhos de Aquino Sirianni	6,687	0.27%	−0.75%
Write-in		60	0.0%	N/A
Total votes		2,508,830	100.0%	N/A
Turnout		2,540,680	66.28%	
Registered electors		3,833,360		
Democratic hold				

== Connecticut ==
Connecticut gubernatorial election
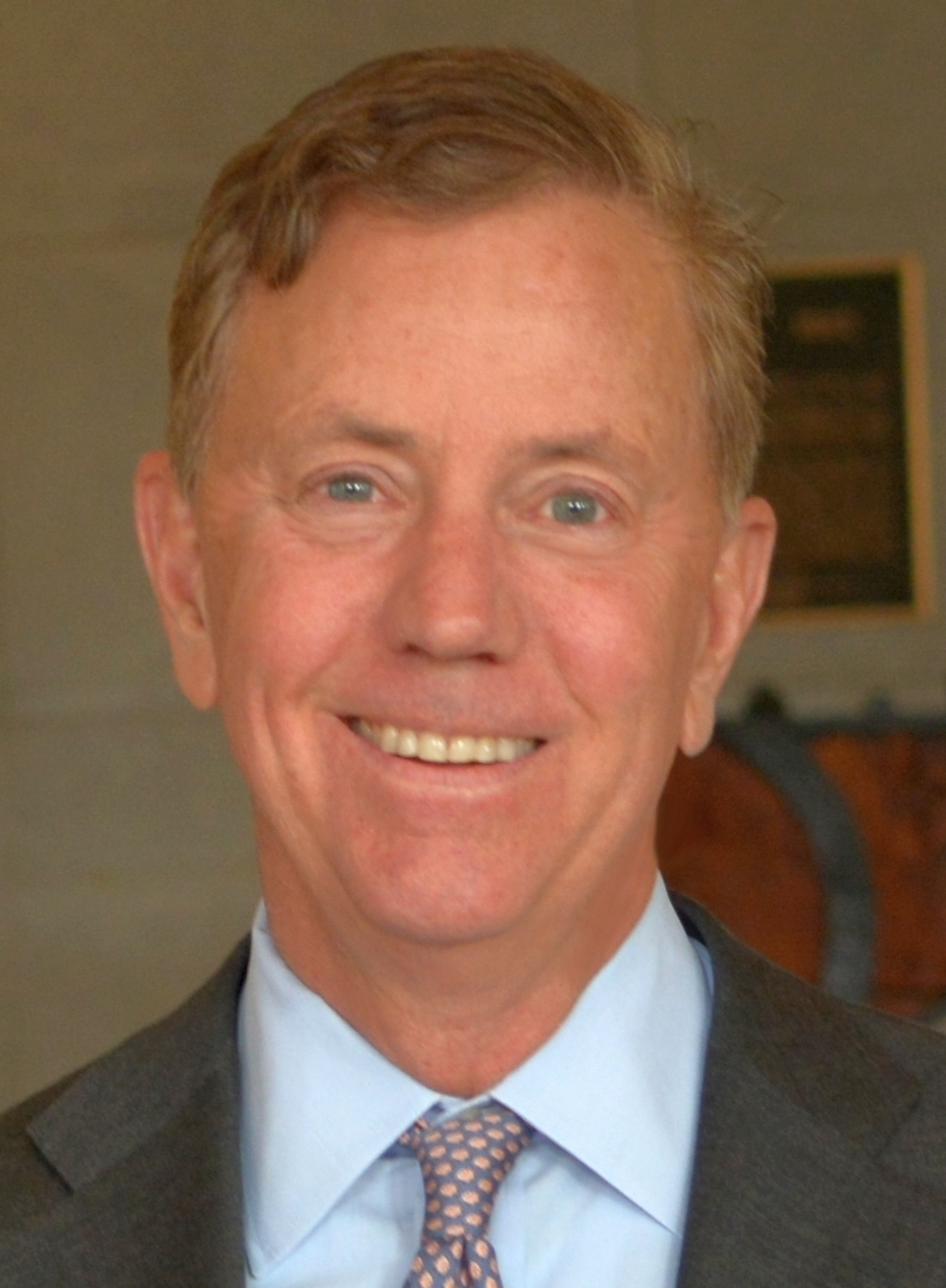

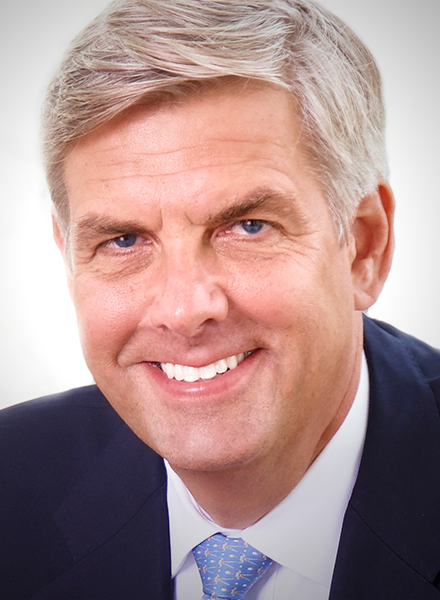
Nominee	Ned Lamont	Bob Stefanowski
Party	Democratic	Republican
Running mate	Susan Bysiewicz	Laura Devlin
Popular vote	709,482	546,209
Percentage	56.0%	43.1%
- County results Lamont: 50–60% Stefanowski: 50–60%
Governor before election
Ned Lamont
Democratic
Elected Governor
Ned Lamont
Democratic

Governor Ned Lamont was elected in 2018 with 49.4% of the vote and ran for re-election for a second term. The race simultaneously took place with the election to the state's Class III Senate seat. This election featured a rematch of the previous 2018 gubernatorial election, pitting Lamont against Republican Bob Stefanowski, who he previously defeated by 3.2% of the vote. This time Lamont won re-election by a wider margin, becoming the first Democrat to win a gubernatorial election by more than 5 points in the state since 1986. This is the first time since 1994 that Tolland County voted Democratic in a gubernatorial election.

2022 Connecticut gubernatorial election
Party	Candidate	Votes	%	±%
Democratic	Ned Lamont (Note: Co-nominated with the Working Families Party and the Griebel-Frank for CT Party) (incumbent); Susan Bysiewicz (incumbent)	710,186	55.97%	+6.60%
Republican	Bob Stefanowski; Laura Devlin	546,209	43.05%	−3.16%
Independent Party	Robert Hotaling; Stewart "Chip" Beckett	12,400	0.98%	N/A
Green	Michelle Louise Bicking (write-in); Cassandra Martineau (write-in)	98	0.0%	N/A
Total votes		1,268,893	100.0%	
Turnout		1,292,847	57.57%	
Registered electors		2,245,844		
Democratic hold				

== Florida ==
Florida gubernatorial election
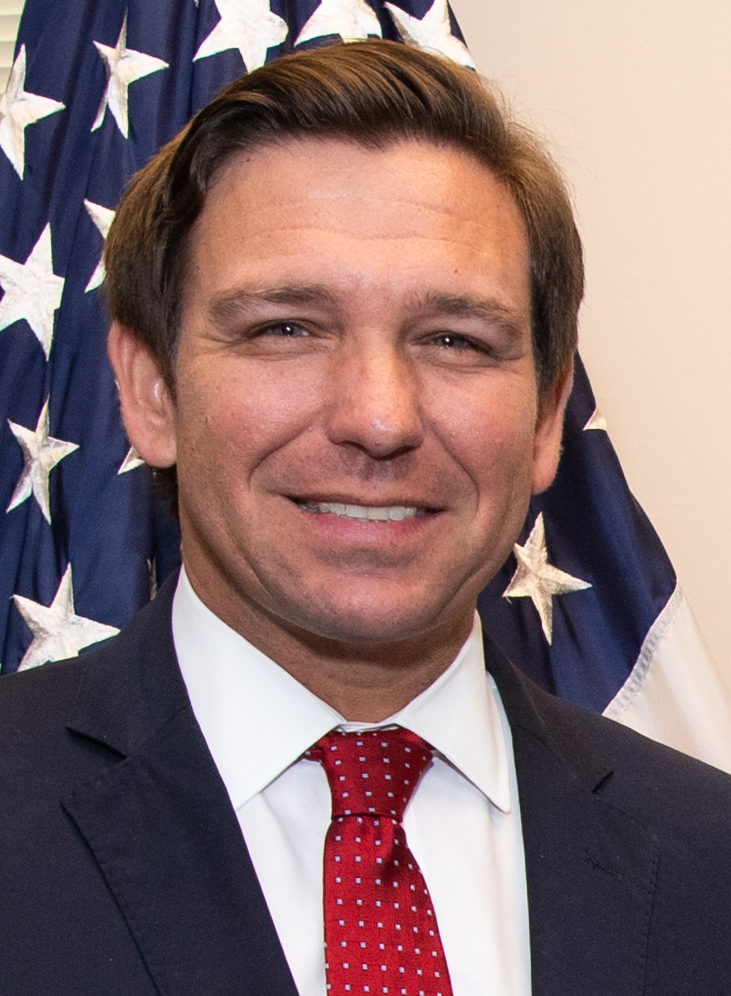

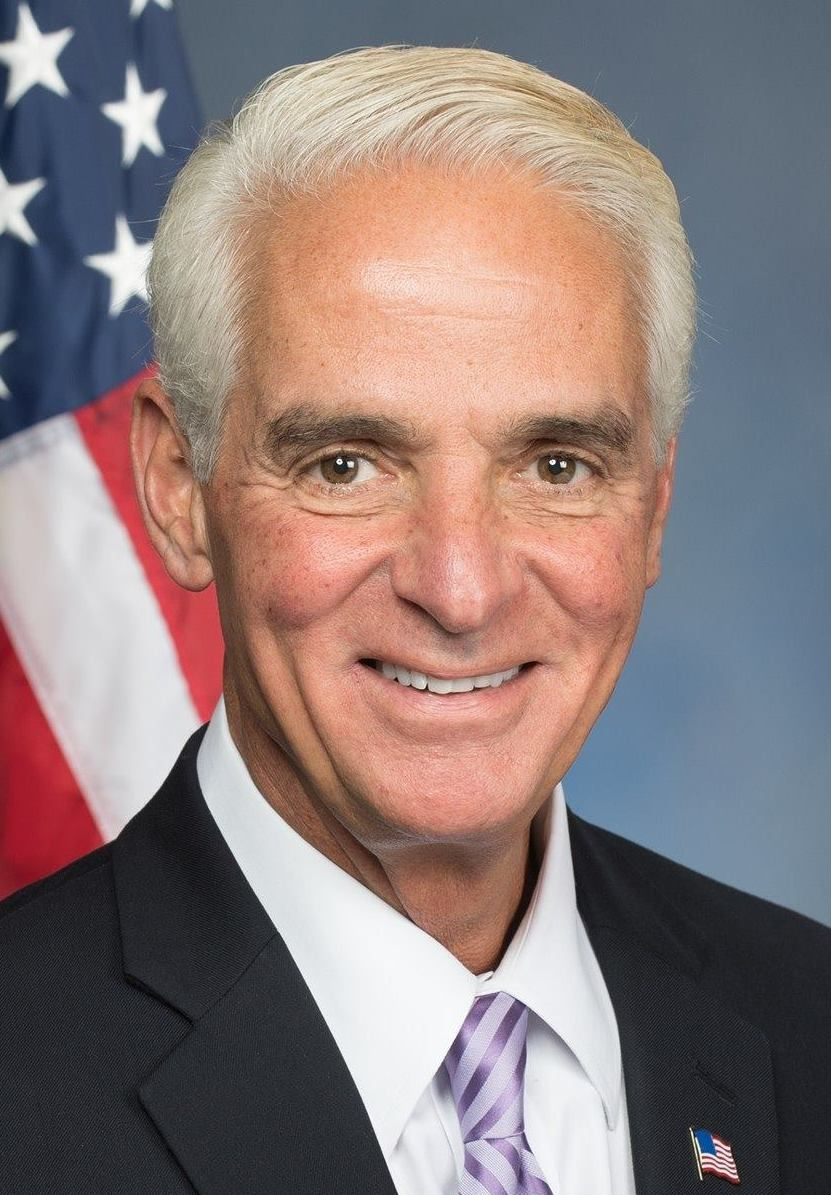
Nominee	Ron DeSantis	Charlie Crist
Party	Republican	Democratic
Running mate	Jeanette Nuñez	Karla Hernandez-Mats
Popular vote	4,614,210	3,106,313
Percentage	59.37%	39.97%
- County results DeSantis: 50–60% 60–70% 70–80% 80–90% >90% Crist: 50–60% 60–70%
Governor before election
Ron DeSantis
Republican
Elected Governor
Ron DeSantis
Republican

Governor Ron DeSantis was elected in 2018 with 49.6% of the vote and ran for reelection to a second term. Andrew Gillum, former mayor of Tallahassee and Democratic nominee for governor in 2018, did not run against DeSantis again.

U.S. representative and former Republican governor of Florida Charlie Crist was the Democratic nominee. Also seeking the Democratic nomination was Florida Agriculture Commissioner Nikki Fried.

DeSantis won re-election by a sizable margin due to the state as a whole swinging further Republican than it voted in the 2020 United States presidential election and continuing the state's rightward shift since the 2008 United States presidential election. County flips by DeSantis were Miami-Dade, Palm Beach, Hillsborough, and Osceola counties, all of which were previous Democratic Party strongholds; these counties, notably, have relatively high Latino populations, for which their growth in support for the Republican Party was further cemented. This election was seen by many to more firmly assert Florida's status as a red state and not a swing state.

Democratic primary results
Party	Candidate	Votes	%
Democratic	Charlie Crist	904,524	59.71%
Democratic	Nicole "Nikki" Fried	535,480	35.35%
Democratic	Cadance Daniel	38,198	2.52%
Democratic	Robert L. Willis	36,786	2.43%
Total votes		1,513,180	100.0%

2022 Florida gubernatorial election
Party	Candidate	Votes	%	±%
Republican	Ron DeSantis (incumbent) Jeanette Nuñez (incumbent)	4,614,210	59.37%	+9.78%
Democratic	Charlie Crist Karla Hernandez	3,106,313	39.97%	−9.22%
Independent	Carmen Jackie Gimenez Kyle "KC" Gibson	31,577	0.41%	N/A
Libertarian	Hector Roos Jerry "Tub" Rorabaugh	19,299	0.25%	N/A
Total votes		7,771,399	100.0%	N/A
Turnout		7,796,916	53.76%	
Registered electors		14,503,978		
Republican hold				

== Georgia ==
Georgia gubernatorial election
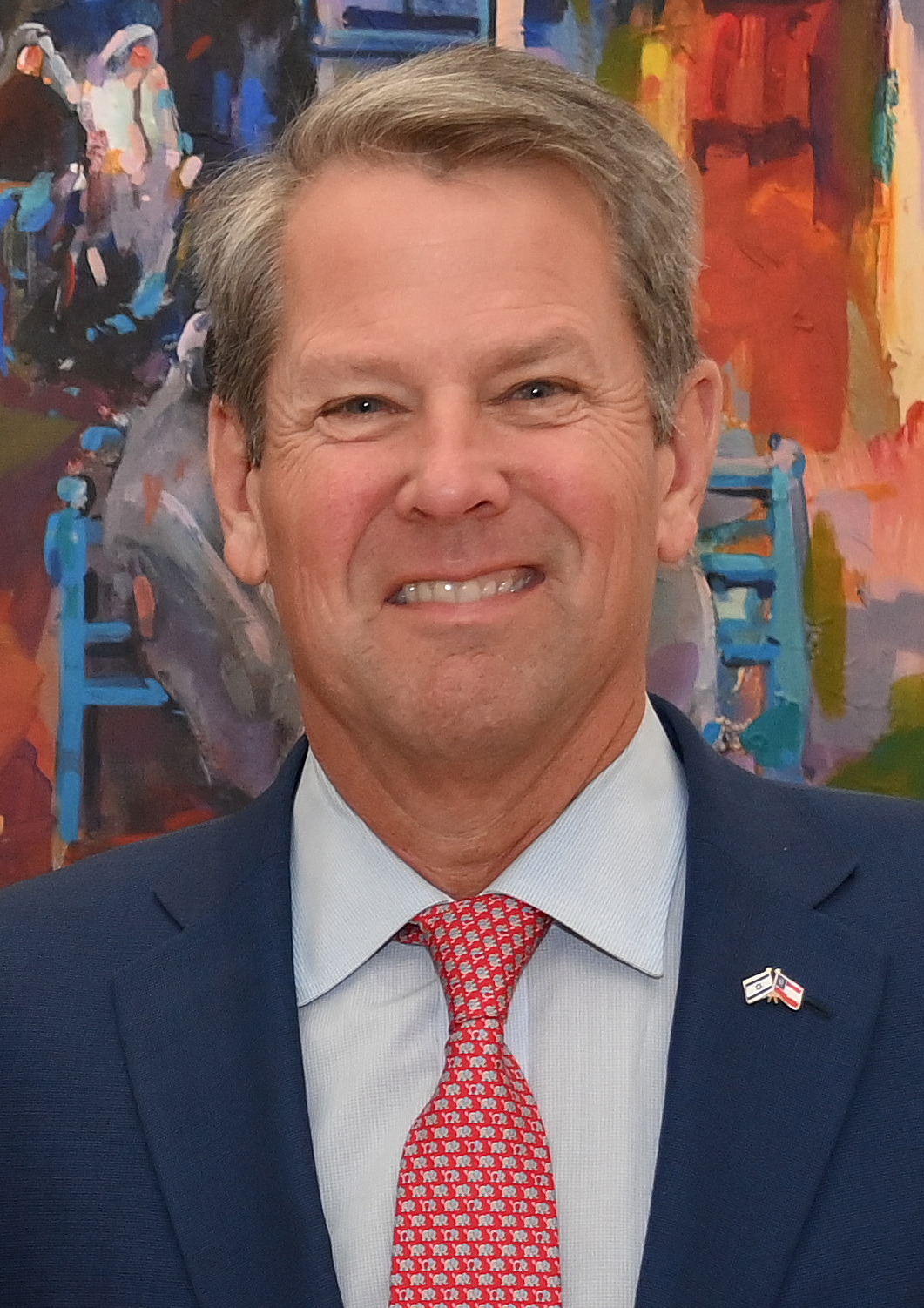

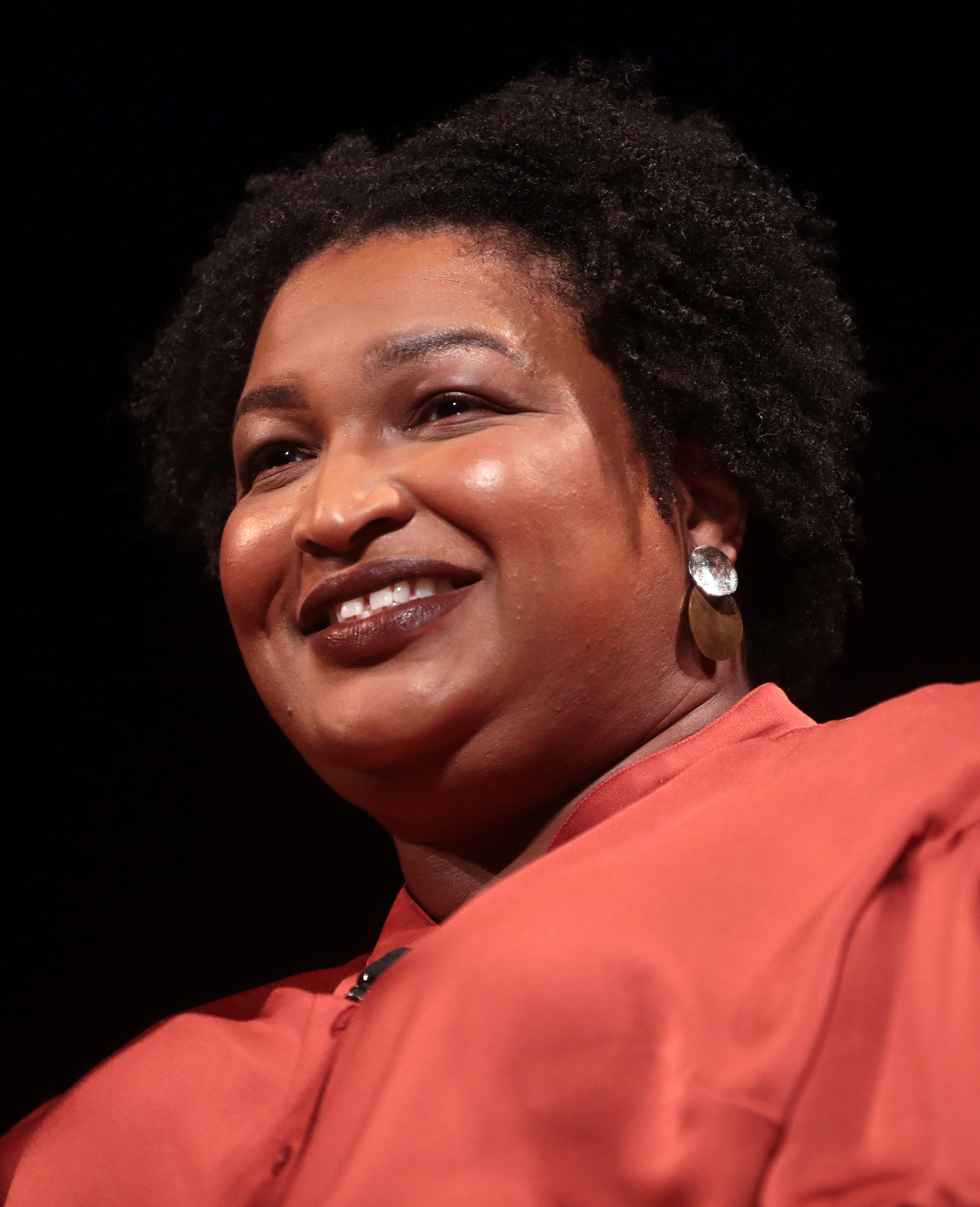
Nominee	Brian Kemp	Stacey Abrams
Party	Republican	Democratic
Popular vote	2,111,572	1,813,673
Percentage	53.41%	45.88%
- County results Kemp: 50–60% 60–70% 70–80% 80–90% >90% Abrams: 50–60% 60–70% 70–80% 80–90%
Governor before election
Brian Kemp
Republican
Elected Governor
Brian Kemp
Republican

Incumbent Republican governor Brian Kemp won re-election to a second term, defeating Democratic nominee Stacey Abrams in a rematch. Abrams conceded on election night. The primary occurred on May 24, 2022. Kemp was sworn in for a second term on January 12, 2023.

Kemp was endorsed by former Vice President Mike Pence. He faced a primary challenge from former U.S. Senator David Perdue, who was endorsed by former president Donald Trump after Kemp refused to overturn the results of the 2020 presidential election in Georgia.

Stacey Abrams, the former Minority Leader of the Georgia House of Representatives and founder of Fair Fight Action who was narrowly defeated by Kemp in the 2018 gubernatorial election, was once again the Democratic nominee for the governorship. This was Georgia's first gubernatorial rematch since 1950.

Libertarian Shane T. Hazel, the Libertarian nominee for U.S. Senate in 2020, also declared he would run. This race was one of six Republican-held governorships up for election in 2022 in a state carried by Joe Biden in the 2020 presidential election.

Despite Kemp's narrow 55,000-vote victory in 2018, which was Georgia's closest gubernatorial election since 1966, he went on to win by 300,000 votes (7.5%) – the largest raw vote victory for a Georgia governor since 2006. The race was seen as a potential benefit to Herschel Walker, who ran in the concurrent Senate race, as it was speculated Kemp's strong performance could help Walker avoid a runoff. He vastly underperformed compared to Kemp, however, and lost to incumbent Democratic senator Raphael Warnock in the December 6 runoff election.

Republican primary results
Party	Candidate	Votes	%
Republican	Brian Kemp (incumbent)	888,078	73.72%
Republican	David Perdue	262,389	21.78%
Republican	Kandiss Taylor	41,232	3.42%
Republican	Catherine Davis	9,778	0.81%
Republican	Tom Williams	3,255	0.27%
Total votes		1,204,742	100.0%

Democratic primary results
Party	Candidate	Votes	%
Democratic	Stacey Abrams	727,168	100.0%
Total votes		727,168	100.0%

2022 Georgia gubernatorial election
Party	Candidate	Votes	%	±%
Republican	Brian Kemp (incumbent)	2,111,572	53.41%	+3.19%
Democratic	Stacey Abrams	1,813,673	45.88%	−2.95%
Libertarian	Shane T. Hazel	28,163	0.71%	−0.24%
Total votes		3,953,408	100.00%	
Turnout		3,964,926	57.02%	
Registered electors		6,953,485		
Republican hold				

== Hawaii ==
Hawaii gubernatorial election
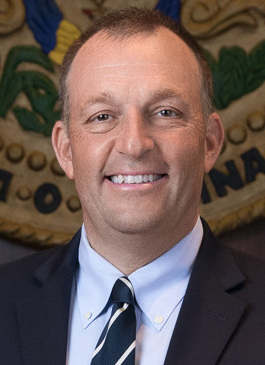

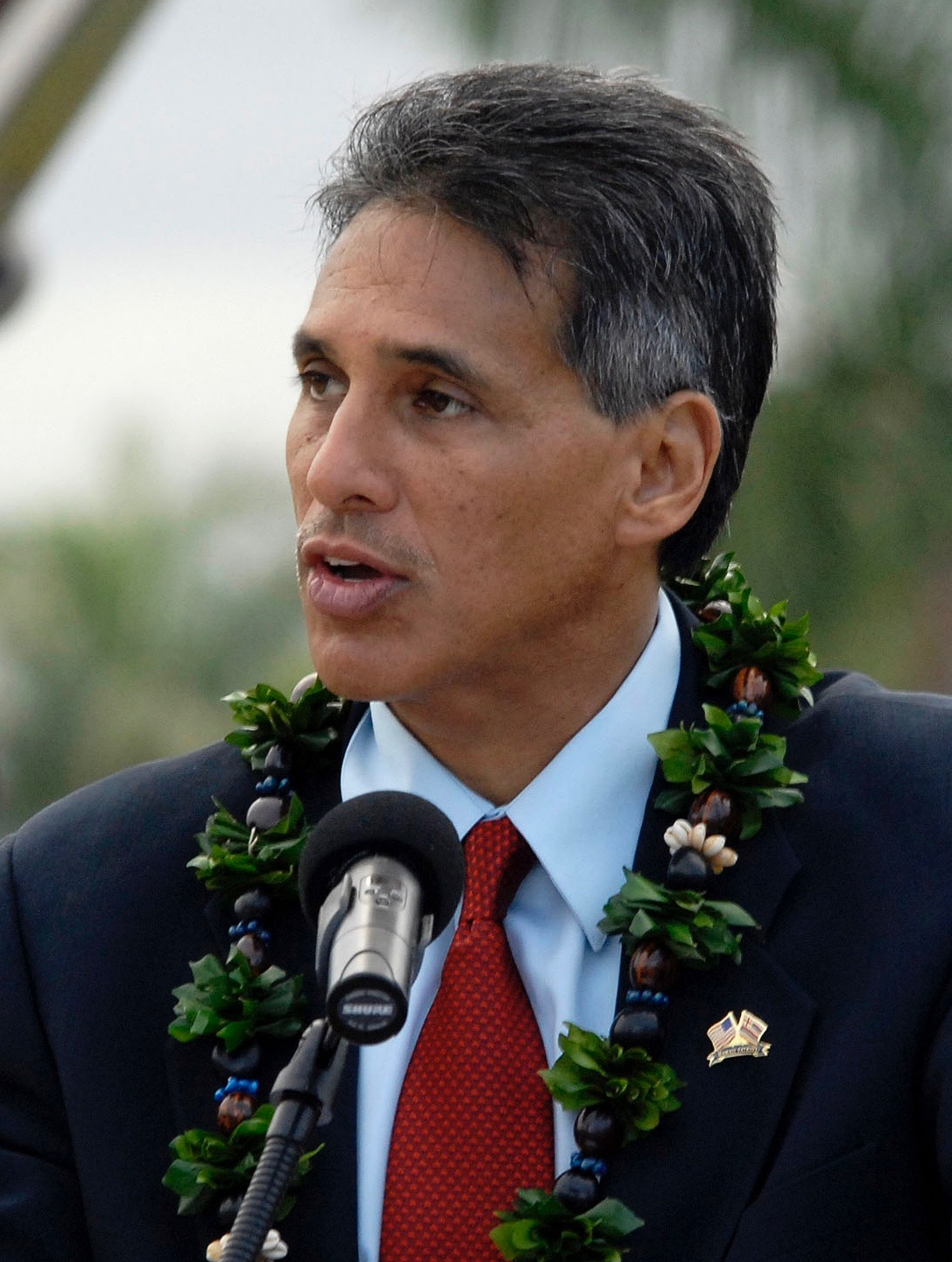
Nominee	Josh Green	Duke Aiona
Party	Democratic	Republican
Running mate	Sylvia Luke	Seaula Tupa'i Jr.
Popular vote	261,025	152,237
Percentage	63.2%	36.8%
- County results Green: 50–60% 60–70%
Governor before election
David Ige
Democratic
Elected Governor
Josh Green
Democratic

Incumbent Democratic governor David Ige was term-limited and ineligible to run for a third consecutive term. Incumbent lieutenant governor Josh Green was the Democratic nominee, and faced former lieutenant governor Duke Aiona, the Republican nominee. This marked the third time Aiona had been the Republican gubernatorial nominee, having previously run unsuccessfully in 2010 and 2014. Green won the election with 63.2% of the vote with Aiona receiving 36.8% of the vote.

Green's performance was the highest percentage of the vote ever received by any gubernatorial candidate in the state's history. Despite this, Aiona performed 3 points better and received 20,000 more raw votes than Andria Tupola did in 2018.

Democratic primary results
Party	Candidate	Votes	%
Democratic	Josh Green	158,161	62.91%
Democratic	Vicky Cayetano	52,447	20.86%
Democratic	Kai Kahele	37,738	15.01%
Democratic	Van Tanabe	1,236	0.49%
Democratic	Richard Kim	991	0.39%
Democratic	David Bourgoin	590	0.23%
Democratic	Clyde Lewman	249	0.10%
Total votes		251,412	100.0%

Republican primary results
Party	Candidate	Votes	%
Republican	Duke Aiona	37,608	49.57%
Republican	B.J. Penn	19,817	26.12%
Republican	Gary Cordery	8,258	10.88%
Republican	Heidi Haunani Tsuneyoshi	7,255	9.56%
Republican	Lynn Barry Mariano	903	1.19%
Republican	Paul Morgan	796	1.05%
Republican	Keline Kahau	469	0.62%
Republican	Walter Woods	438	0.58%
Republican	Moses Paskowitz	189	0.25%
Republican	George Hawat	140	0.18%
Total votes		75,873	100.0%

2022 Hawaii gubernatorial election
Party	Candidate	Votes	%	±%
Democratic	Josh Green; Sylvia Luke	259,901	63.21%	+0.54
Republican	Duke Aiona; Seaula Tupa'i Jr.	151,258	36.79%	+3.09
Total votes		411,159	100.00%	
Turnout		417,215	48.44%	–4.24
Registered electors		861,358		
Democratic hold				

== Idaho ==
Idaho gubernatorial election
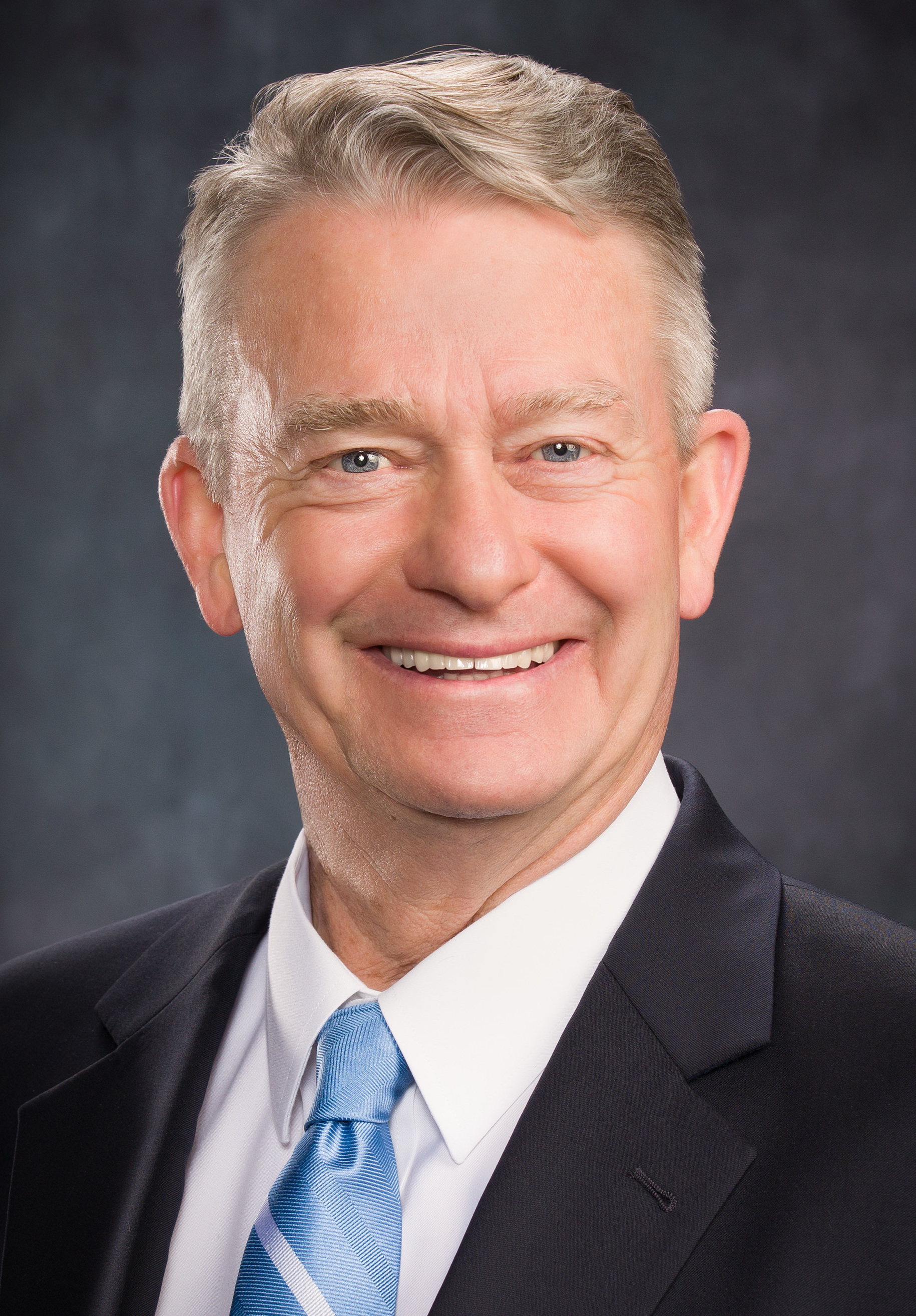

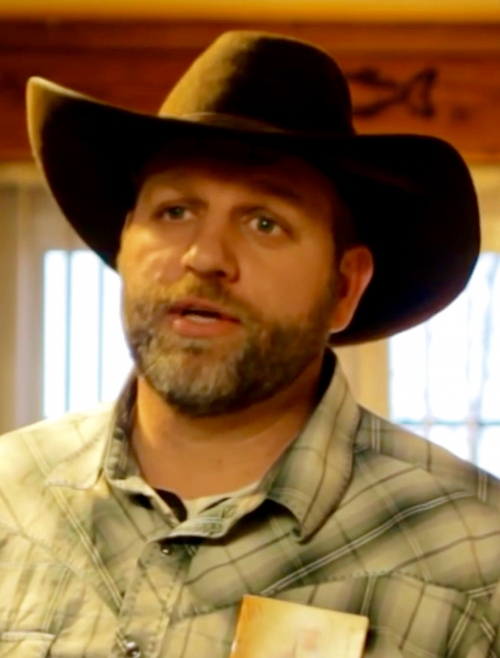
Nominee	Brad Little	Stephen Heidt	Ammon Bundy
Party	Republican	Democratic	Independent
Popular vote	358,598	120,160	101,835
Percentage	60.5%	20.3%	17.2%
- County results Little: 40–50% 50–60% 60–70% 70–80% Heidt: 50–60%
Governor before election
Brad Little
Republican
Elected Governor
Brad Little
Republican

Governor Brad Little was elected in 2018 with 59.8% of the vote and ran for re-election to a second term. Little won his re-election bid by a landslide, defeating his Democratic challenger Stephen Heidt.

Incumbent lieutenant governor Janice McGeachin announced a primary challenge to Little, but Little won the Republican primary. Anti-government activist Ammon Bundy also announced a run for the Republican nomination, but switched to an independent on February 17, 2022.

The Democratic nominee was Stephen Heidt.

Republican primary
Party	Candidate	Votes	%
Republican	Brad Little (incumbent)	148,831	52.8
Republican	Janice McGeachin	90,854	32.2
Republican	Ed Humphreys	30,877	11.0
Republican	Steve Bradshaw	5,470	1.9
Republican	Ashley Jackson	3,172	1.1
Republican	Lisa Marie	1,119	0.4
Republican	Ben Cannady	804	0.3
Republican	Cody Usabel	680	0.2
Total votes		281,807	100

Democratic primary
Party	Candidate	Votes	%
Democratic	Stephen Heidt	25,088	78.8
Democratic	Write-ins	6,757	21.2
Total votes		31,845	100

2022 Idaho gubernatorial election
Party	Candidate	Votes	%	±%
Republican	Brad Little (incumbent)	358,598	60.52%	+0.76%
Democratic	Stephen Heidt	120,160	20.28%	−17.91%
Independent	Ammon Bundy	101,835	17.19%	N/A
Libertarian	Paul Sand	6,714	1.13%	+0.05%
Constitution	Chantyrose Davison	5,250	0.89%	−0.07%
Total votes		592,557	100.0%	N/A
Turnout		599,353	57.18%	–4.24
Registered electors		1,048,263		
Republican hold				

== Illinois ==
Illinois gubernatorial election
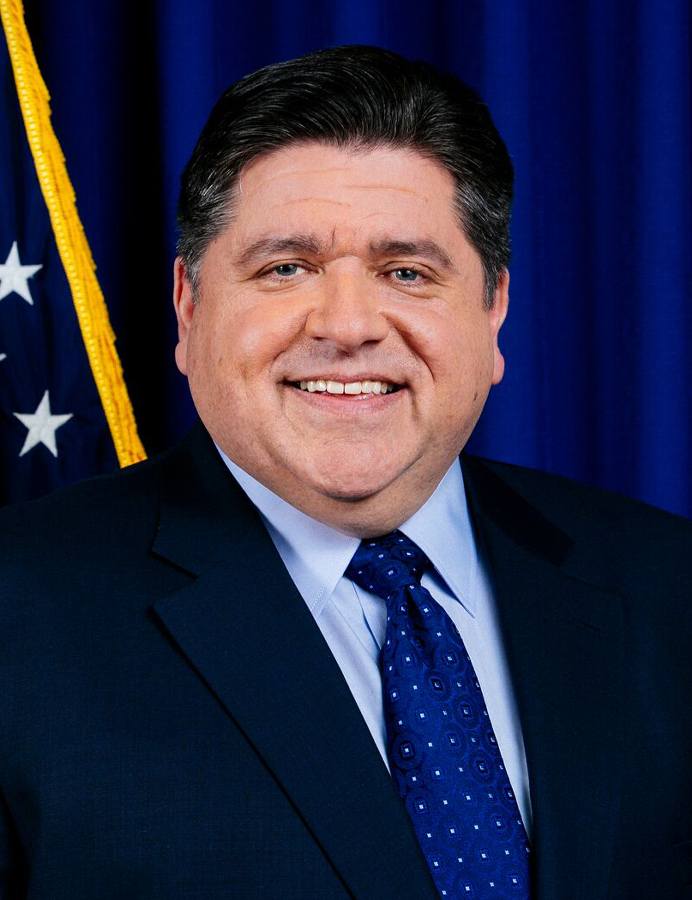

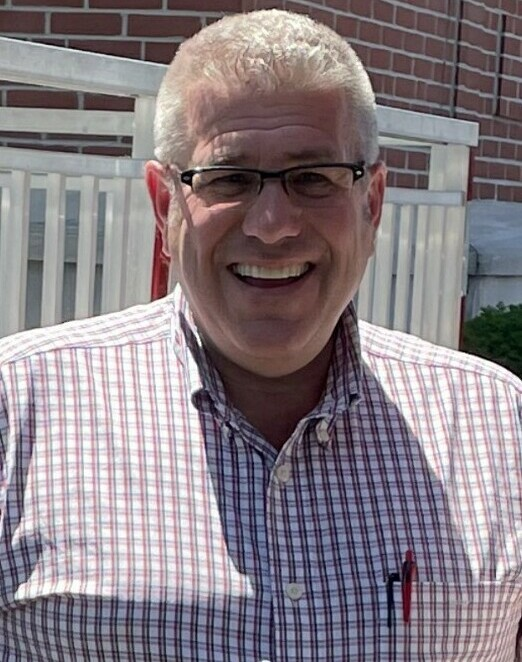
Nominee	J. B. Pritzker	Darren Bailey
Party	Democratic	Republican
Running mate	Juliana Stratton	Stephanie Trussell
Popular vote	2,253,748	1,739,095
Percentage	54.9%	42.4%
- County results Pritzker: 40–50% 50–60% 60–70% 70–80% Bailey: 40–50% 50–60% 60–70% 70–80% 80–90%
Governor before election
J. B. Pritzker
Democratic
Elected Governor
J. B. Pritzker
Democratic

Governor J. B. Pritzker was elected in 2018 with 54.5% of the vote and ran for a second term. In the general election, Pritzker won re-election with 54.9% of the vote.

Republican candidates who announced their candidacy included Richard Irvin, Darren Bailey, Gary Rabine, Paul Schimpf, and Jesse Sullivan. Bailey won the primary on June 28.

Democratic primary results
Party	Candidate	Votes	%
Democratic	J. B. Pritzker (incumbent); Juliana Stratton (incumbent)	810,989	91.88%
Democratic	Beverly Miles; Karla Shaw	71,704	8.12%
Total votes		882,693	100.0%

Republican primary results
Party	Candidate	Votes	%
Republican	Darren Bailey; Stephanie Trussell	458,102	57.48%
Republican	Jesse Sullivan; Kathleen Murphy	125,094	15.70%
Republican	Richard Irvin; Avery Bourne	119,592	15.00%
Republican	Gary Rabine; Aaron Del Mar	52,194	6.55%
Republican	Paul Schimpf; Carolyn Schofield	34,676	4.35%
Republican	Max Solomon; Latasha H. Fields	7,371	0.92%
Total votes		797,029	100.0%

2022 Illinois gubernatorial election
Party	Candidate	Votes	%	±%
Democratic	J. B. Pritzker (incumbent); Juliana Stratton (incumbent)	2,253,748	54.91%	+0.38%
Republican	Darren Bailey; Stephanie Trussell	1,739,095	42.37%	+3.54%
Libertarian	Scott Schluter; John Phillips	111,712	2.72%	+0.32%
Write-in		81	0.0%	−0.01%
Total votes		4,104,636	100.0%	
Turnout			%	
Registered electors				
Democratic hold				

== Iowa ==
Iowa gubernatorial election
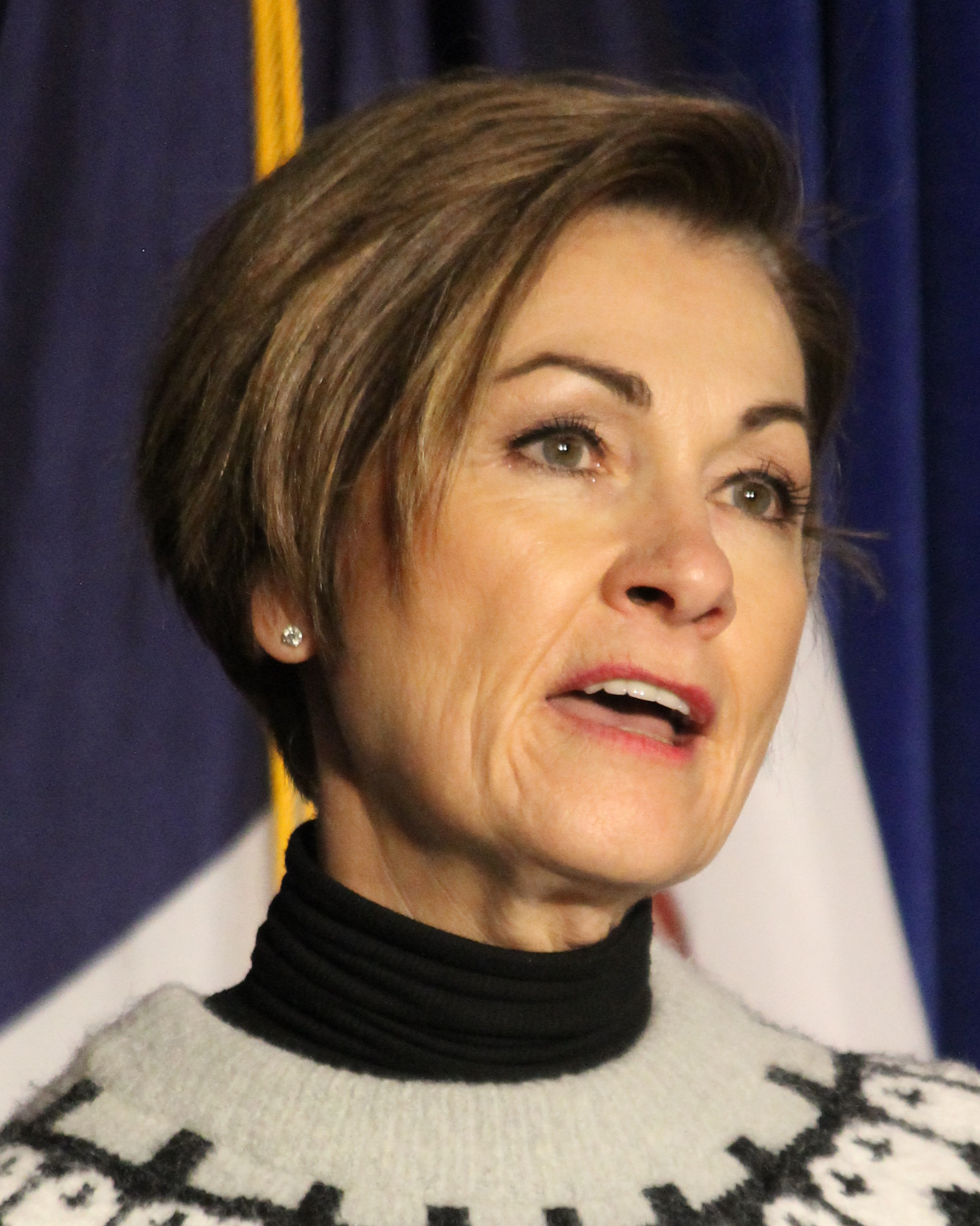

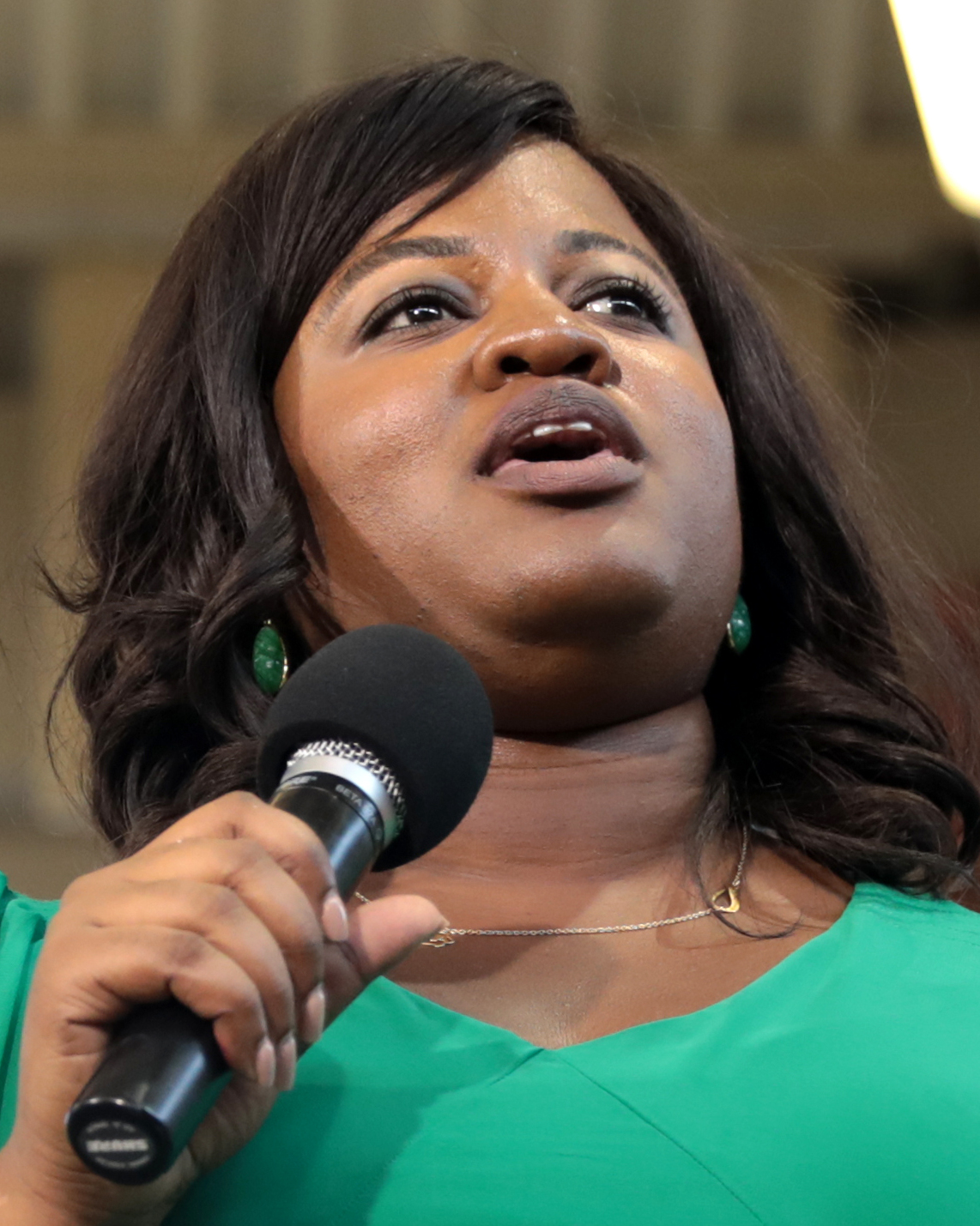
Nominee	Kim Reynolds	Deidre DeJear
Party	Republican	Democratic
Running mate	Adam Gregg	Eric Van Lancker
Popular vote	709,198	482,950
Percentage	58.0%	39.5%
- County results Reynolds: 50–60% 60–70% 70–80% 80–90% DeJear: 50–60% 60–70%
Governor before election
Kim Reynolds
Republican
Elected Governor
Kim Reynolds
Republican

Governor Kim Reynolds took office on May 24, 2017, upon the resignation of Terry Branstad and was elected to a full term in her own right in 2018 with 50.3% of the vote. She ran for re-election to a second full term. In the general election, incumbent Republican governor Kim Reynolds won re-election in a landslide, defeating Democratic nominee Deidre DeJear.

Democrat Deidre DeJear, who announced her candidacy in August 2021, was the Democratic nominee.

Republican primary results
Party	Candidate	Votes	%
Republican	Kim Reynolds (incumbent)	185,293	99.03%
Write-in		1,808	0.97%
Total votes		187,101	100.0%

Democratic primary results
Party	Candidate	Votes	%
Democratic	Deidre DeJear	145,555	99.45%
Democratic	Write-ins	801	0.55%
Total votes		146,356	100.0%

2022 Iowa gubernatorial election
Party	Candidate	Votes	%	±%
Republican	Kim Reynolds (incumbent); Adam Gregg (incumbent)	709,198	58.04%	+7.78%
Democratic	Deidre DeJear; Eric Van Lacker	482,950	39.53%	−8.00%
Libertarian	Rick Stewart; Marco Battaglia	28,998	2.37%	+0.84%
Write-in		718	0.06%	+0.02%
Total votes		1,221,864	100.00	
Turnout		1,230,416	55.06%	
Registered electors		2,234,666		
Republican hold				

== Kansas ==
Kansas gubernatorial election
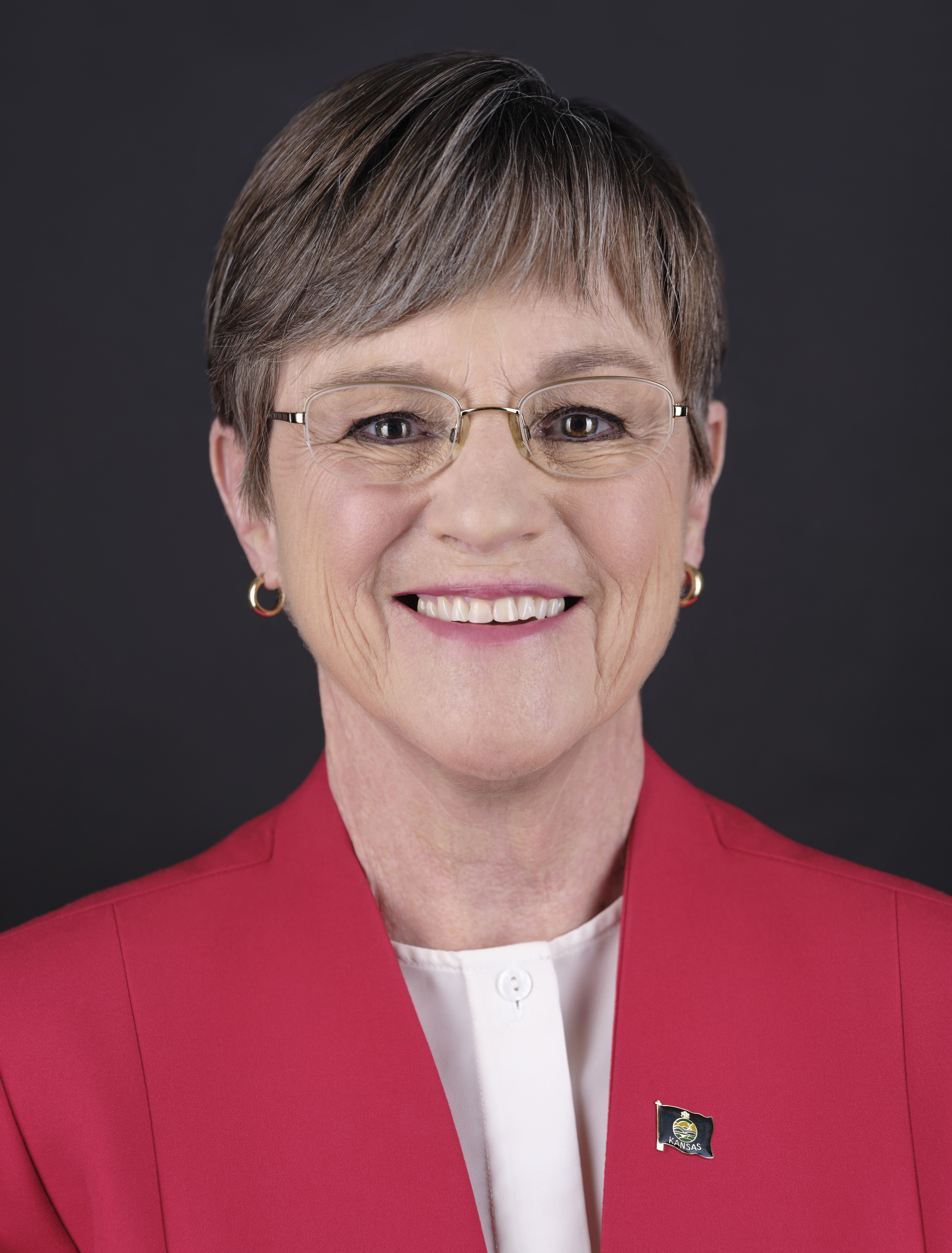

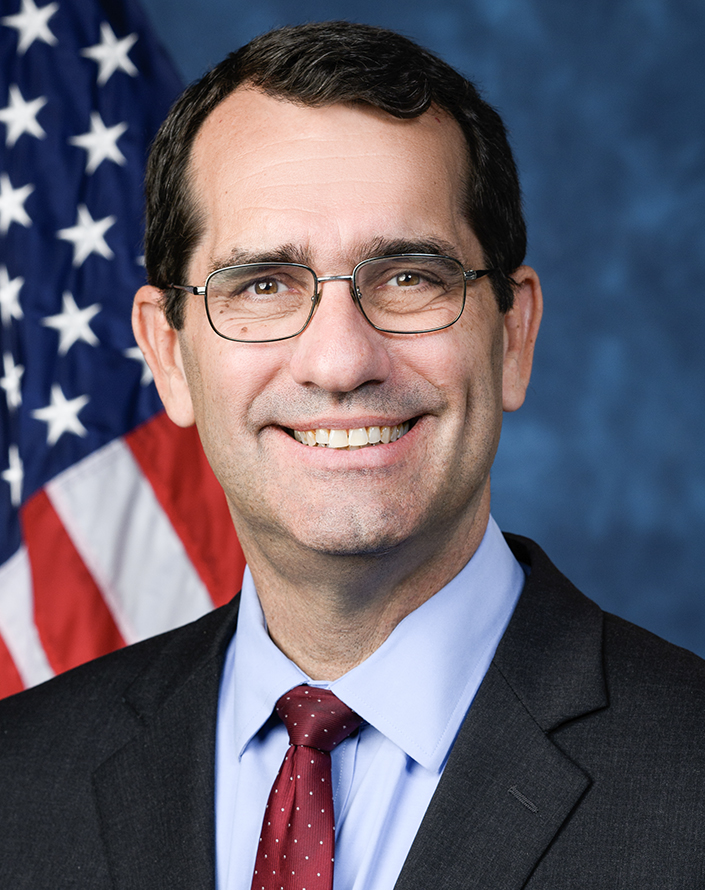
Nominee	Laura Kelly	Derek Schmidt
Party	Democratic	Republican
Running mate	David Toland	Katie Sawyer
Popular vote	499,849	477,591
Percentage	49.5%	47.3%
- County results Kelly: 40–50% 50–60% 60–70% 70–80% Schmidt: 40–50% 50–60% 60–70% 70–80% 80–90%
Governor before election
Laura Kelly
Democratic
Elected Governor
Laura Kelly
Democratic

Governor Laura Kelly, a Democrat, was elected in 2018 with 48% of the vote and ran for re-election to a second term. On the Republican side, Kansas Attorney General Derek Schmidt ran against her.

Kelly narrowly won re-election, defeating Schmidt by 49.5% of the vote to 47.3% and by a margin of 20,614 votes in a minor upset.

Laura Kelly won the election by a margin of 2.2 percentage points over Derek Schmidt, similar to the percentage of votes that independent Dennis Pyle received. Kansas Republican Party Chair Mike Kuckelman pointed to this as evidence that Pyle was somewhat responsible for Schmidt's defeat. However, Pyle insisted that "Kansas needed a strong conservative candidate" and instead highlighted Schmidt's underperformance compared to other Republican candidates in Kansas.

Kelly's personal popularity was also a factor in her victory, where a majority of voters approved of Kelly's job performance, while only a third did so for President Joe Biden. Her win was also propelled by Democratic candidates' increased strength in suburban areas, such as Johnson County, in spite of Schmidt's increased vote share from 2018 in the Republican strongholds of rural Kansas.

Democratic primary results
Party	Candidate	Votes	%
Democratic	Laura Kelly (incumbent); David Toland (incumbent)	270,968	93.84
Democratic	Richard Karnowski; Barry Franco	17,802	6.16
Total votes		288,770	100

Republican primary results
Party	Candidate	Votes	%
Republican	Derek Schmidt; Katie Sawyer	373,524	80.60
Republican	Arlyn Briggs; Lance Berland	89,898	19.40
Total votes		463,422	100

2022 Kansas gubernatorial election
Party	Candidate	Votes	%	±%
Democratic	Laura Kelly (incumbent); David Toland (incumbent)	499,849	49.54%	+1.53%
Republican	Derek Schmidt; Katie Sawyer	477,591	47.33%	+4.35%
Independent	Dennis Pyle; Kathleen Garrison	20,452	2.03%	N/A
Libertarian	Seth Cordell; Evan Laudick-Gains	11,106	1.10%	−0.80%
Total votes		1,008,998	100.0%	
Turnout			47.94%	
Democratic hold				

== Maine ==
Maine gubernatorial election
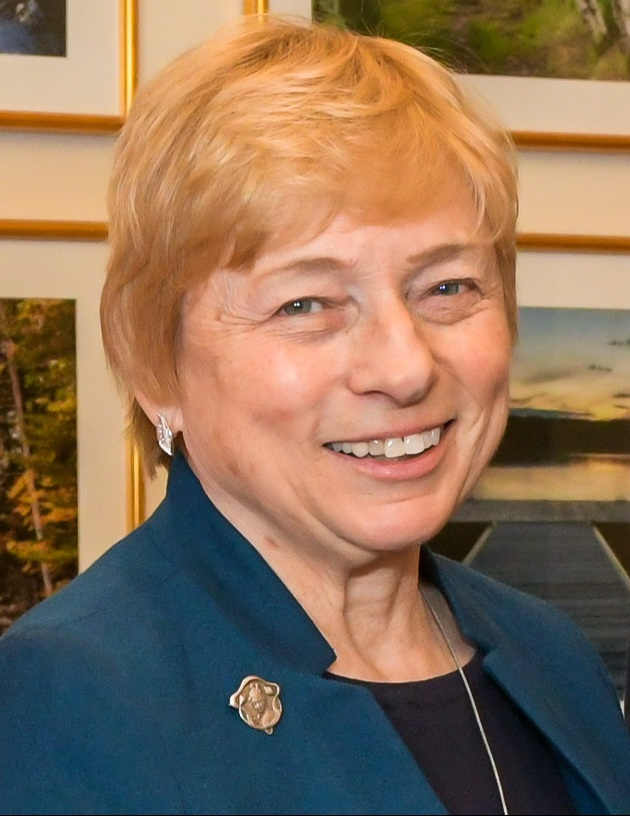

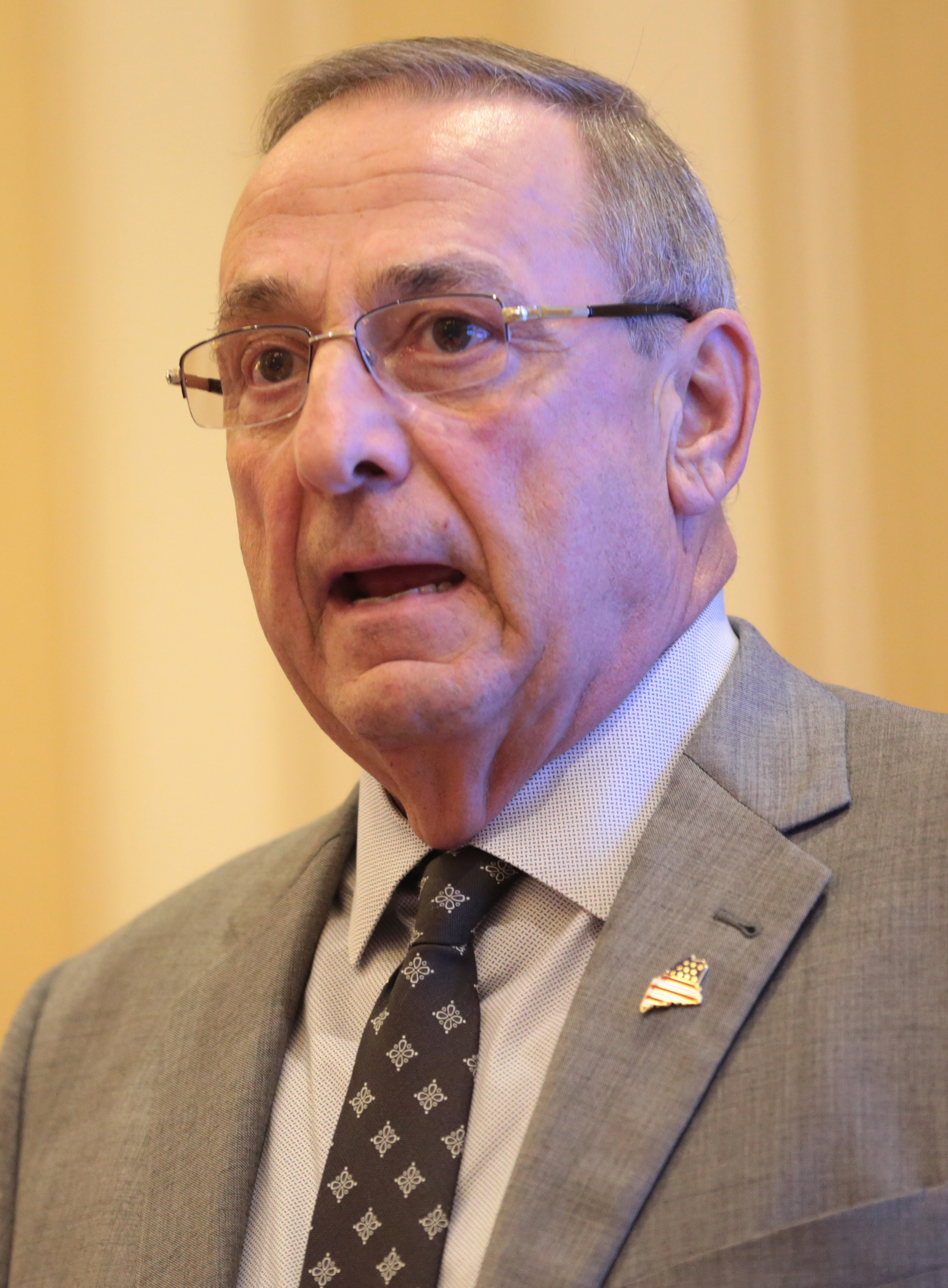
Nominee	Janet Mills	Paul LePage
Party	Democratic	Republican
Popular vote	376,934	287,304
Percentage	55.69%	42.45%
- County results Mills: 40–50% 50–60% 60–70% LePage: 40–50% 50–60% 60–70%
Governor before election
Janet Mills
Democratic
Elected Governor
Janet Mills
Democratic

Governor Janet Mills, a Democrat, was first elected in 2018 with 50.9% of the vote. Mills easily won re-election, soundly defeating Paul LePage by over 13 points, 55.7%–42.4%. Hunkler took 1.9%. Mills's margin of victory was the largest for any Maine gubernatorial candidate since Angus King won re-election in 1998, and the largest victory for a statewide Democratic candidate since George J. Mitchell won re-election to the US Senate in 1988.

Democratic primary results
Party	Candidate	Votes	%
Democratic	Janet Mills (incumbent)	69,422	93.42%
Democratic	Blank ballots	4,889	6.58%
Total votes		74,311	100.0%

Republican primary results
Party	Candidate	Votes	%
Republican	Paul LePage	59,713	90.91%
Republican	Blank ballots	5,971	9.09%
Total votes		65,684	100.0%

2022 Maine gubernatorial election
Party	Candidate	Votes	%	±%
Democratic	Janet Mills (incumbent)	376,934	55.69%	+4.80%
Republican	Paul LePage	287,304	42.45%	−0.73%
Independent	Sam Hunkler	12,581	1.86%	N/A
Total votes		676,819	100.0%	N/A
Turnout			%	
Registered electors				
Democratic hold				

== Maryland ==
Maryland gubernatorial election
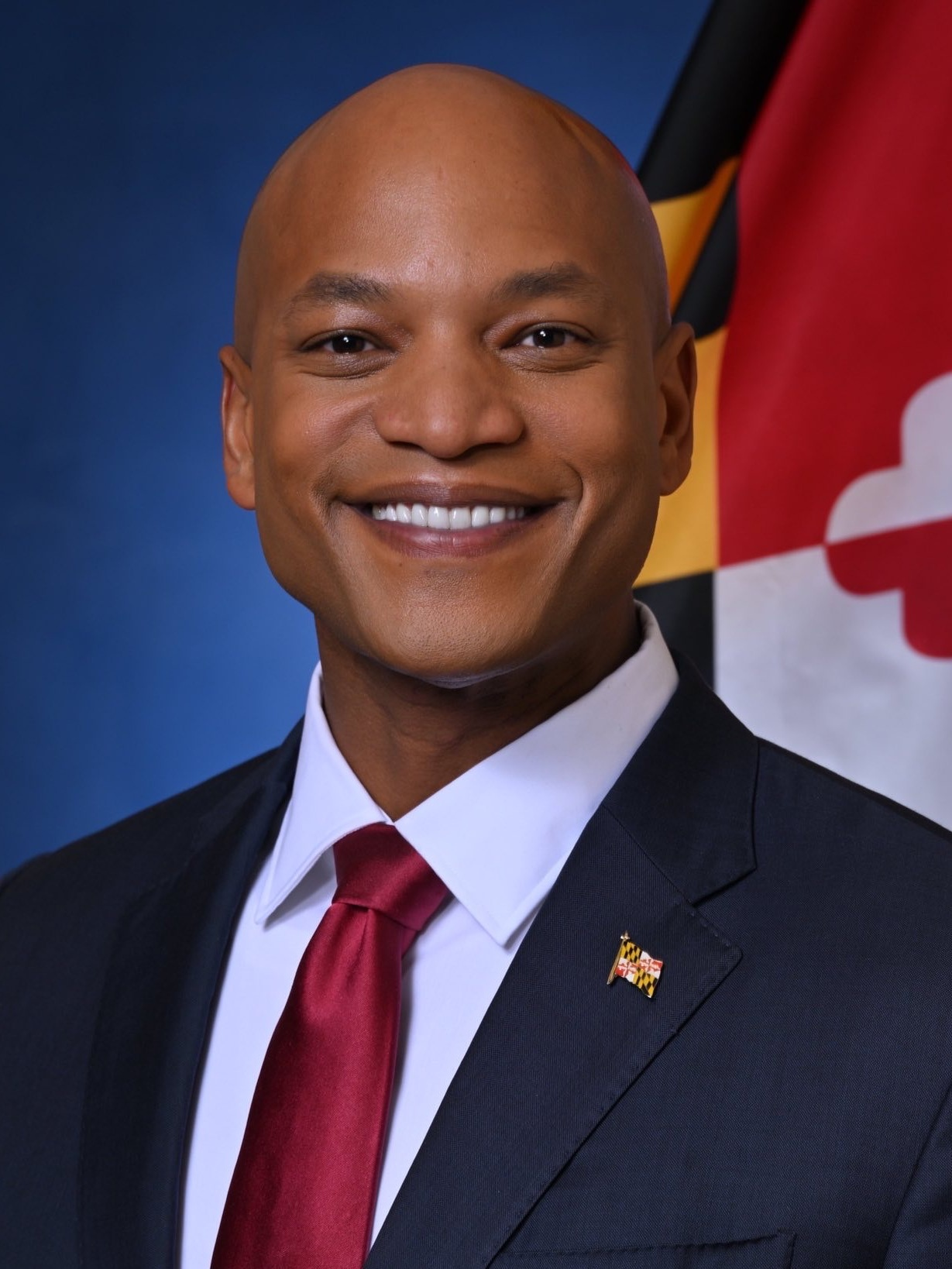

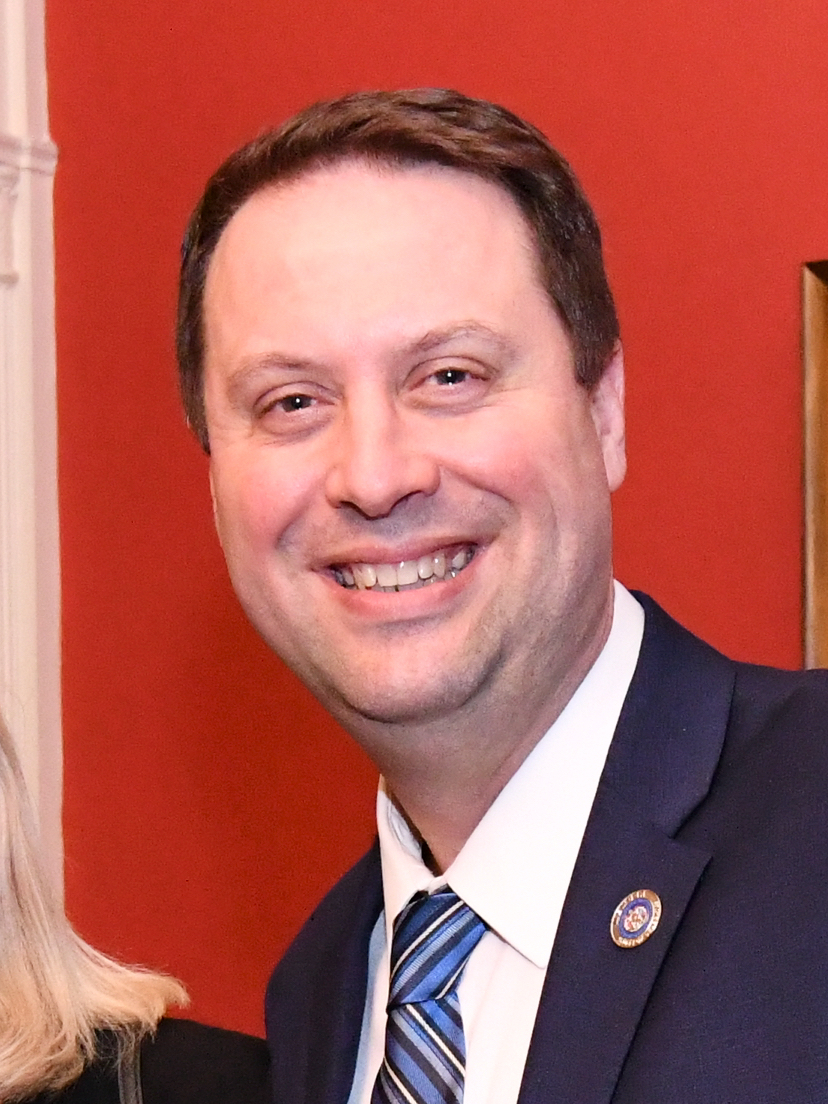
Nominee	Wes Moore	Dan Cox
Party	Democratic	Republican
Running mate	Aruna Miller	Gordana Schifanelli
Popular vote	1,293,944	644,000
Percentage	64.5%	32.1%
- Moore: 50–60% 60–70% 70–80% 80–90% Cox: 50–60% 60–70% 70–80%
Governor before election
Larry Hogan
Republican
Elected Governor
Wes Moore
Democratic

Incumbent governor Larry Hogan, the two-term Republican, was term-limited and could not seek a third consecutive term.

The Democratic and Republican primaries were held on July 19, with state delegate Dan Cox securing the Republican nomination, while author and former nonprofit CEO Wes Moore won the Democratic nomination. Political observers gave Moore a strong chance of defeating Cox in the general election in this reliably Democratic state where Democrats outnumber Republicans 2-to-1. Shortly after polls closed, several national news organizations called the election for Moore. Moore became the first African-American governor of Maryland after being sworn in on January 18, 2023.

This race was also one of six Republican-held governorships up for election in 2022 in a state carried by Joe Biden in the 2020 presidential election, and one of three that voted for Biden by double-digits. Moore flipped six counties that had voted for Hogan in 2018, and his electoral strength largely came from densely populated Prince George's County and Baltimore, where he improved on the margins of 2018 Democratic nominee Ben Jealous by roughly 20 percent. Moore's margin of victory was the highest of any gubernatorial candidate in the state since William Donald Schaefer in 1986.

Republican primary results
Party	Candidate	Votes	%
Republican	Dan Cox; Gordana Schifanelli	153,423	52.00%
Republican	Kelly Schulz; Jeff Woolford	128,302	43.48%
Republican	Robin Ficker; LeRoy F. Yegge Jr.	8,268	2.80%
Republican	Joe Werner; Minh Thanh Luong	5,075	1.72%
Total votes		295,068	100.0%

Democratic primary results
Party	Candidate	Votes	%
Democratic	Wes Moore; Aruna Miller	217,524	32.41%
Democratic	Tom Perez; Shannon Sneed	202,175	30.12%
Democratic	Peter Franchot; Monique Anderson-Walker	141,586	21.10%
Democratic	Rushern Baker (withdrawn); Nancy Navarro (withdrawn)	26,594	3.96%
Democratic	Doug Gansler; Candace Hollingsworth	25,481	3.80%
Democratic	John King Jr.; Michelle Siri	24,882	3.71%
Democratic	Ashwani Jain; LaTrece Hawkins Lytes	13,784	2.05%
Democratic	Jon Baron; Natalie Williams	11,880	1.77%
Democratic	Jerome Segal; Justinian M. Dispenza	4,276	0.64%
Democratic	Ralph Jaffe; Mark Greben	2,978	0.44%
Total votes		671,160	100.0%

2022 Maryland gubernatorial election
Party	Candidate	Votes	%	±%
Democratic	Wes Moore; Aruna Miller	1,293,944	64.53%	+21.02%
Republican	Dan Cox; Gordana Schifanelli	644,000	32.12%	−24.23%
Libertarian	David Lashar; Christiana Logansmith	30,101	1.50%	+0.93%
Working Class	David Harding; Cathy White	17,154	0.86%	N/A
Green	Nancy Wallace; Patrick Elder	14,580	0.73%	+0.25%
Write-in		5,444	0.27%	+0.19%
Total votes		2,005,223	100.0%	N/A
Turnout		2,031,635	49.26%	−9.80%
Registered electors		4,124,156		
Democratic gain from Republican				

== Massachusetts ==
Massachusetts gubernatorial election
- November 8, 2022
- Turnout: 51.4% ▼8.75%
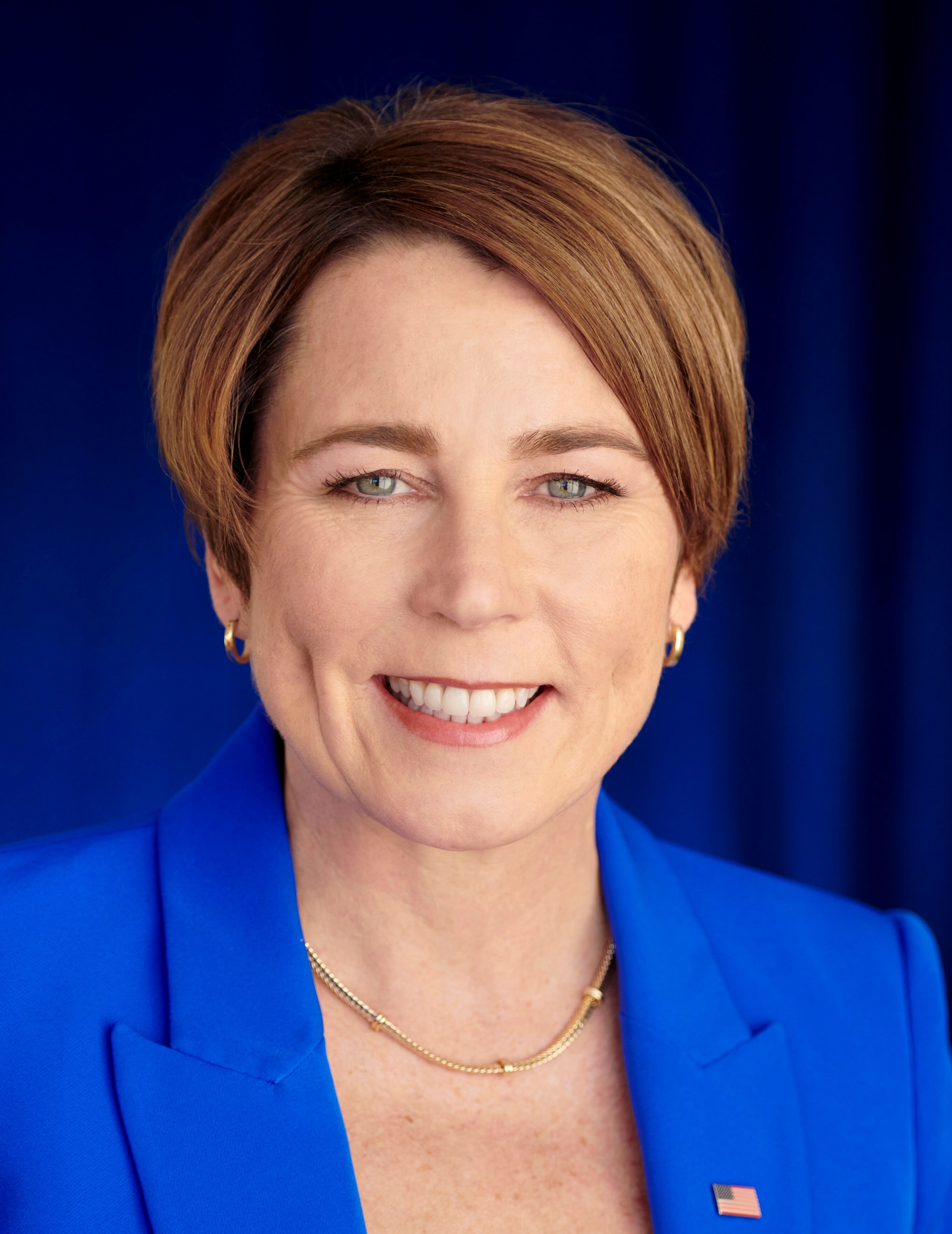

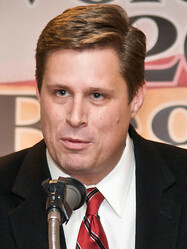
Nominee	Maura Healey	Geoff Diehl
Party	Democratic	Republican
Running mate	Kim Driscoll	Leah Cole Allen
Popular vote	1,584,403	859,343
Percentage	63.7%	34.6%
- Healey: 40–50% 50–60% 60–70% 70–80% 80–90% Diehl: 40–50% 50–60% 60–70%
Governor before election
Charlie Baker
Republican
Elected Governor
Maura Healey
Democratic

Governor Charlie Baker was re-elected to a second term in 2018 with 66.6% of the vote. Because Massachusetts does not have gubernatorial term limits in its Constitution, he was eligible to run for re-election for a third term. However, in December 2021, Baker announced he would not be running for re-election.

Geoff Diehl, a former state representative and Chris Doughty were running for the Republican nomination. Massachusetts attorney general Maura Healey and state senator Sonia Chang-Díaz were running for the Democratic nomination.

Diehl and Healey won their respective primaries on September 6.

Due to Massachusetts's strong liberal lean and Diehl's conservative political views, Healey was widely expected to win the election. The general election was called for the Democrat shortly after polls closed, with Healey becoming the first woman ever elected governor of Massachusetts and the first openly lesbian governor to take office in United States history.

Republican primary results
Party	Candidate	Votes	%
Republican	Geoff Diehl	149,800	55.44%
Republican	Chris Doughty	120,418	44.56%
Total votes		270,218	100.0%

Democratic primary results
Party	Candidate	Votes	%
Democratic	Maura Healey	642,092	85.54%
Democratic	Sonia Chang-Díaz (withdrawn)	108,574	14.46%
Total votes		750,666	100.0%

2022 Massachusetts gubernatorial election
Party	Candidate	Votes	%	±%
Democratic	Maura Healey; Kim Driscoll	1,584,403	63.74%	+30.62%
Republican	Geoff Diehl; Leah Cole Allen	859,343	34.57%	−32.03%
Libertarian	Kevin Reed; Peter Everett	39,244	1.58%	N/A
Write-in		2,806	0.11%	−0.17%
Total votes		2,485,796	100.0%	
Turnout		2,511,461	51.4%	−9.37%
Registered electors				
Democratic gain from Republican				

== Michigan ==
Michigan gubernatorial election
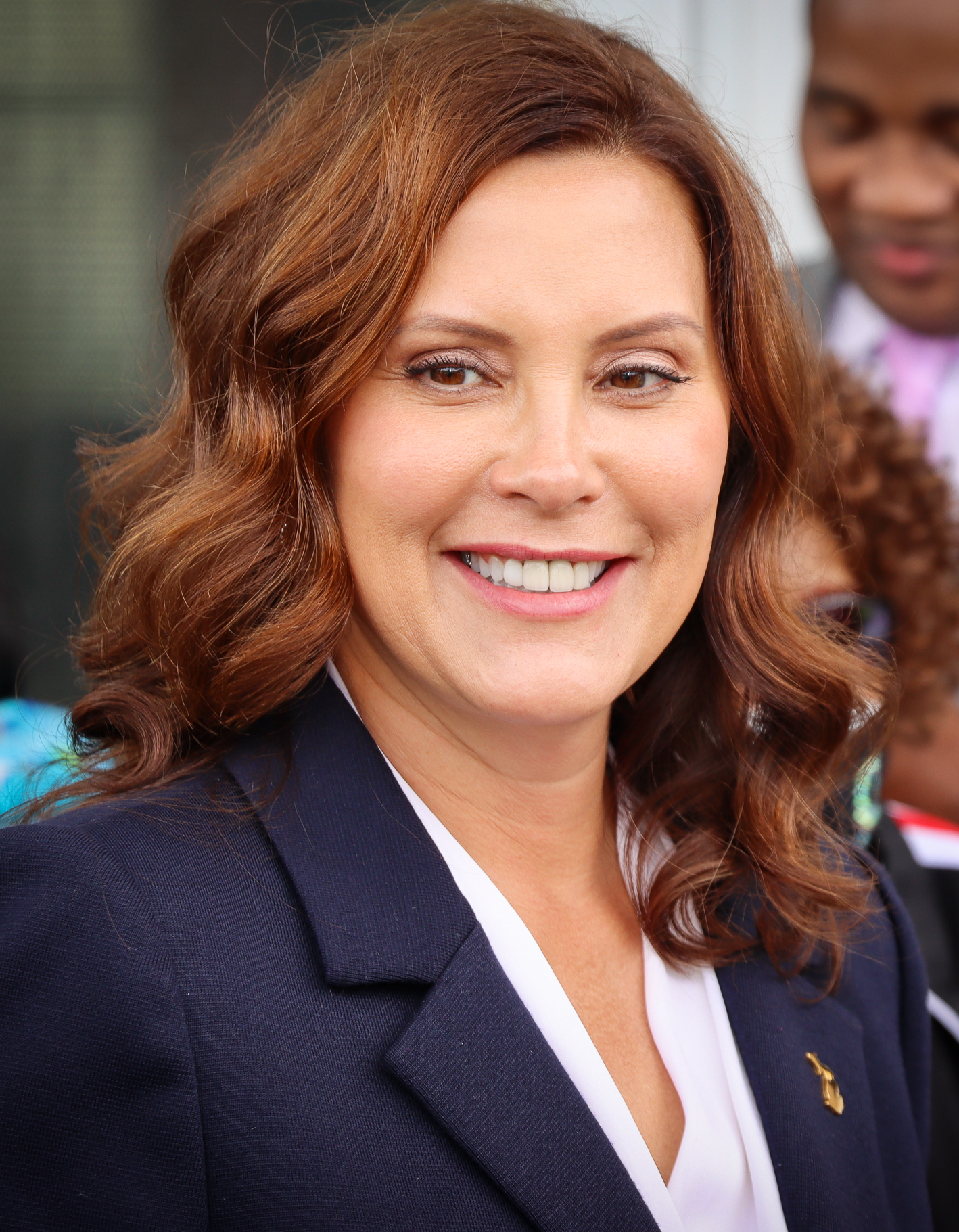

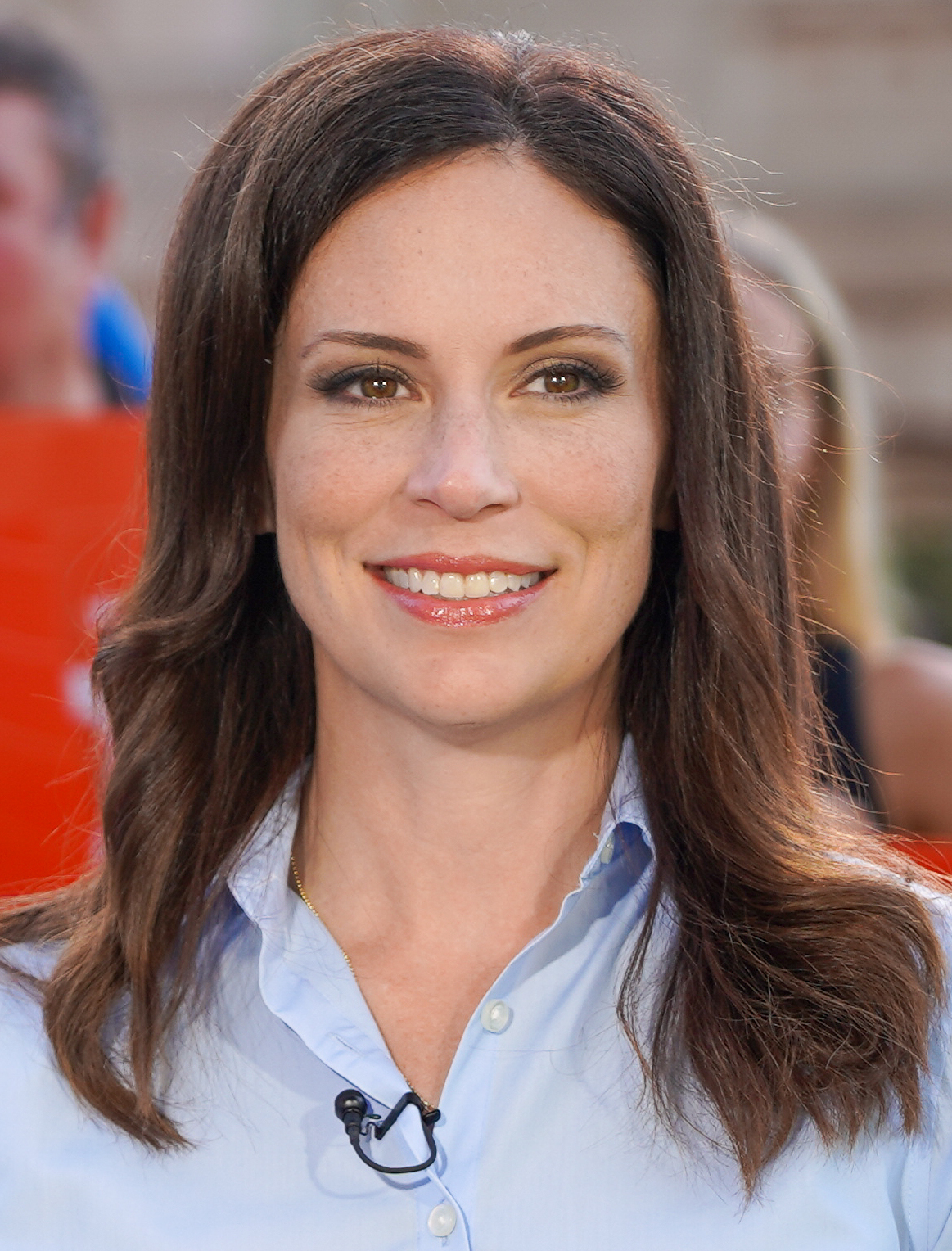
Nominee	Gretchen Whitmer	Tudor Dixon
Party	Democratic	Republican
Running mate	Garlin Gilchrist	Shane Hernandez
Popular vote	2,430,505	1,960,635
Percentage	54.5%	43.9%
- County results Whitmer: 40–50% 50–60% 60–70% 70–80% Dixon: 40–50% 50–60% 60–70% 70–80%
Governor before election
Gretchen Whitmer
Democratic
Elected Governor
Gretchen Whitmer
Democratic

Incumbent Democratic governor Gretchen Whitmer ran for re-election to a second term and faced former political commentator Tudor Dixon in the general election. Whitmer defeated Dixon by a vote margin of nearly 11 percentage points, a larger victory than when she was first elected four years prior.

Democratic primary results
Party	Candidate	Votes	%
Democratic	Gretchen Whitmer (incumbent)	938,382	100.0%
Total votes		938,382	100.0%

Republican primary results
Party	Candidate	Votes	%
Republican	Tudor Dixon	436,350	39.69%
Republican	Kevin Rinke	236,306	21.50%
Republican	Garrett Soldano	192,442	17.51%
Republican	Ryan Kelley	165,587	15.06%
Republican	Ralph Rebandt	45,046	4.10%
Write-in		23,542	2.14%
Total votes		1,099,273	100.0%

2022 Michigan gubernatorial election
Party	Candidate	Votes	%	±%
Democratic	Gretchen Whitmer (incumbent); Garlin Gilchrist (incumbent)	2,430,505	54.47%	+1.16%
Republican	Tudor Dixon; Shane Hernandez	1,960,635	43.94%	+0.19%
Libertarian	Mary Buzuma; Brian Ellison	38,800	0.87%	−0.46%
Constitution	Donna Brandenburg; Mellissa Carone	16,246	0.36%	−0.33%
Green	Kevin Hogan; Destiny Clayton	10,766	0.24%	−0.44%
Natural Law	Daryl M. Simpson; Doug Dern	4,973	0.11%	−0.13%
Write-in		47	0.00%	±0.0%
Total votes		4,461,972	100.0%	
Turnout				
Registered electors				
Democratic hold				

== Minnesota ==
Minnesota gubernatorial election
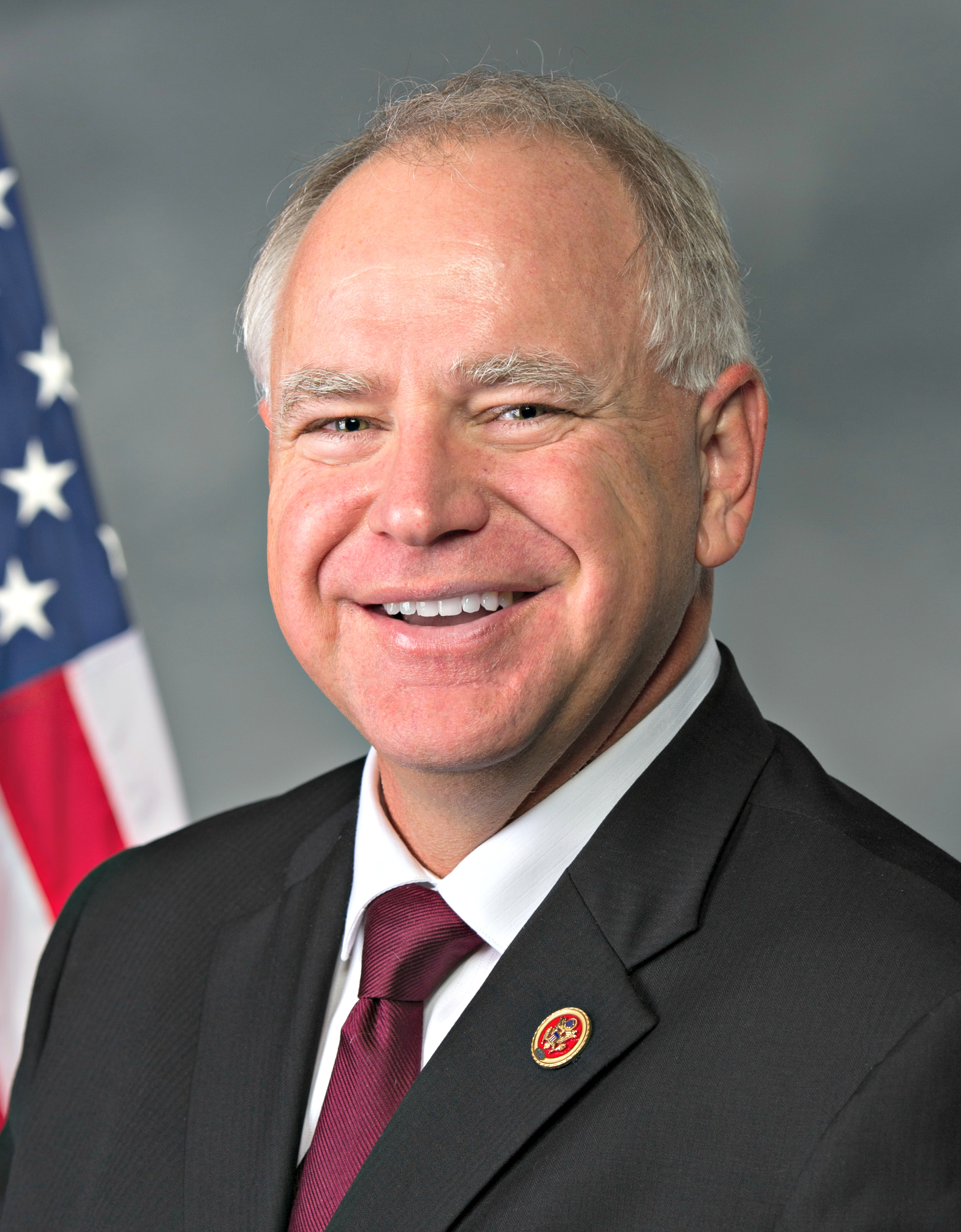

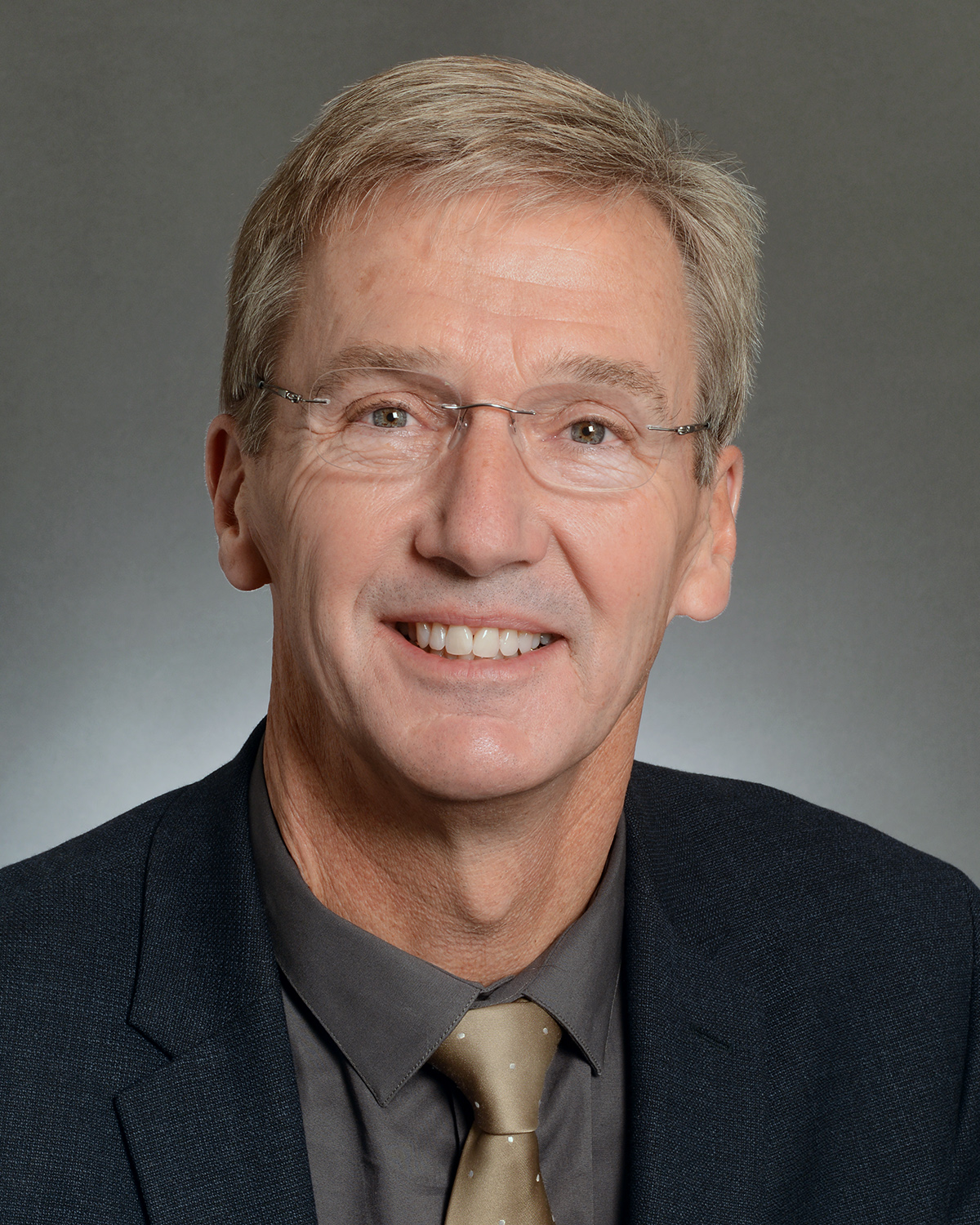
Nominee	Tim Walz	Scott Jensen
Party	Democratic (DFL)	Republican
Running mate	Peggy Flanagan	Matt Birk
Popular vote	1,312,349	1,119,941
Percentage	52.3%	44.6%
- Walz: 40–50% 50–60% 60–70% 70–80% Jensen: 40–50% 50–60% 60–70% 70–80%
Governor before election
Tim Walz
Minnesota DFL
Elected Governor
Tim Walz
Minnesota DFL

Incumbent Democratic (DFL) Governor Tim Walz defeated the Republican nominee, former state senator Scott Jensen, winning a second term.

In the end, Jensen's advantage in rural Greater Minnesota could not overcome Walz's large lead in the Twin Cities metropolitan area, with Walz going on to win the election with a comfortable 7.7% margin. However, this was the first time ever in Walz's career that he lost Minnesota's 1st congressional district, the district that he used to represent in Congress and prior to this election, carried seven times in a row. This election was also the first time ever that Walz failed to carry the following counties in any election which he ran in: Freeborn County, Houston County, Mower County, and Winona County. Winona County was significant given the fact that President Joe Biden carried the county in 2020.

Democratic–Farmer–Labor primary results
Party	Candidate	Votes	%
Democratic (DFL)	Tim Walz (incumbent)	416,973	96.54%
Democratic (DFL)	Ole Savior	14,950	3.46%
Total votes		431,923	100.0%

Republican primary results
Party	Candidate	Votes	%
Republican	Scott Jensen	288,499	89.31%
Republican	Joyce Lynne Lacey	21,308	6.60%
Republican	Bob "Again" Carney Jr.	13,213	4.09%
Total votes		323,020	100.0%

2022 Minnesota gubernatorial election
Party	Candidate	Votes	%	±%
Democratic (DFL)	Tim Walz (incumbent); Peggy Flanagan (incumbent)	1,312,349	52.27%	−1.57%
Republican	Scott Jensen; Matt Birk	1,119,941	44.61%	+2.18%
Legal Marijuana Now	James McCaskel; David Sandbeck	29,346	1.17%	N/A
Grassroots—LC	Steve Patterson; Matt Huff	22,599	0.90%	−1.75%
Independence	Hugh McTavish; Mike Winter	18,156	0.72%	N/A
Socialist Workers	Gabrielle Prosser; Kevin Dwire	7,241	0.29%	N/A
Write-in		1,029	0.04%	±0.0%
Total votes		2,510,661	100.0%	
Turnout		2,525,873	61.01%	
Registered electors		4,140,218		
Democratic (DFL) hold				

== Nebraska ==
2022 Nebraska gubernatorial election
- November 8, 2022
- Turnout: 54.93% ▼3.02 pp
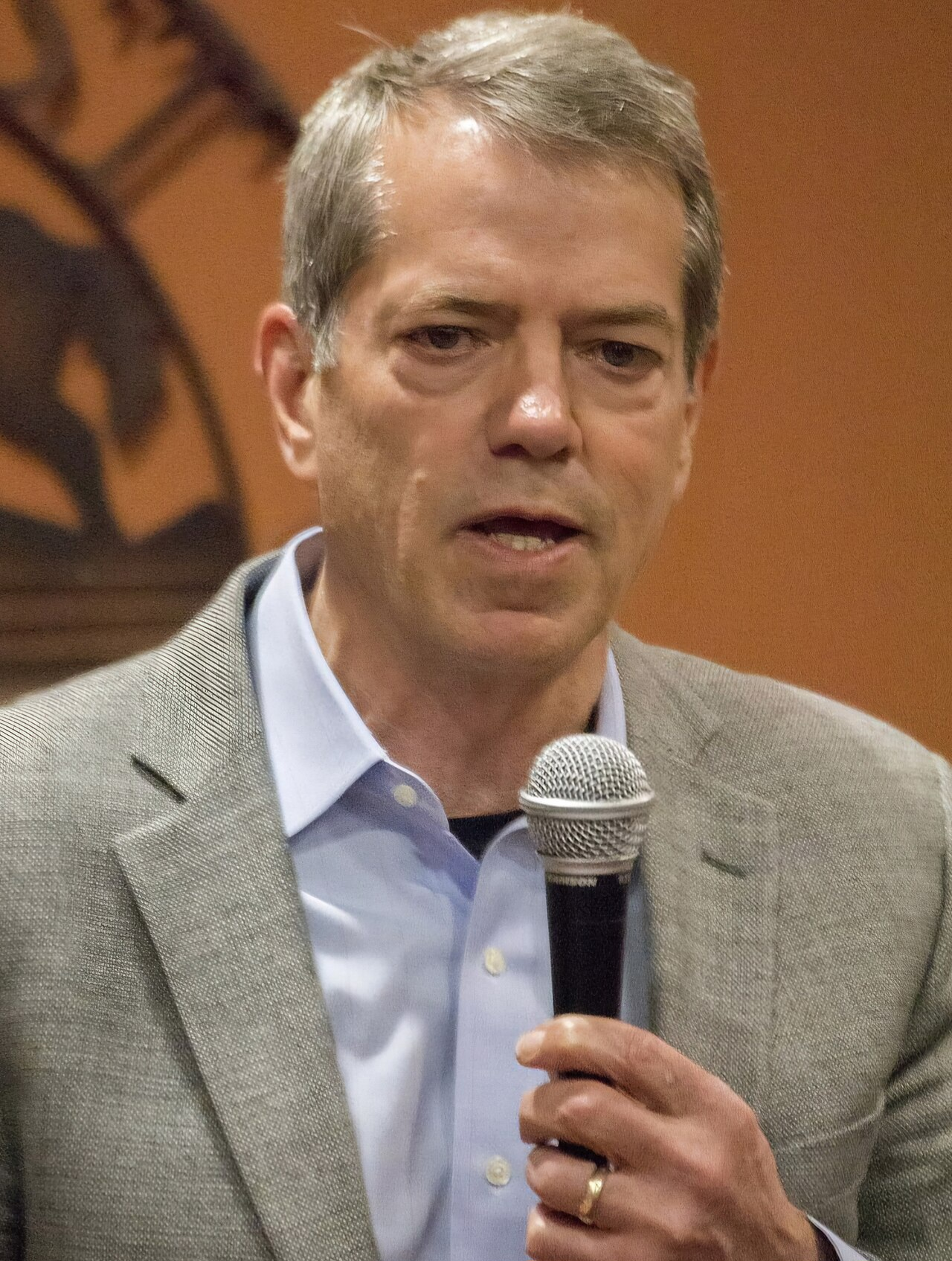
Nominee	Jim Pillen	Carol Blood
Party	Republican	Democratic
Running mate	Joe Kelly	Al Davis
Popular vote	398,334	242,006
Percentage	59.74%	36.29%
- Pillen: 40–50% 50–60% 60–70% 70–80% 80–90% Blood: 40–50% 50–60%
Governor before election
Pete Ricketts
Republican
Elected Governor
Jim Pillen
Republican

Incumbent Republican governor Pete Ricketts was re-elected to a second term in 2018. He was term-limited by the Nebraska Constitution in 2022 and could not seek re-election for a third consecutive term.

In the general election, Republican Jim Pillen went on to win the gubernatorial election by a 23-point margin.

Nebraska's primary elections were held on May 10. Former University of Nebraska Board of Regents chair Jim Pillen won the Republican nomination, while state senator Carol Blood won the Democratic nomination.

The race took on increased importance in October 2022, when U.S. Senator Ben Sasse announced he would resign and Ricketts said he would allow the winner of the 2022 gubernatorial election to appoint Sasse's replacement. The winner, Jim Pillen, ultimately decided to appoint his predecessor (Ricketts) to fill Sasse's seat.

Republican primary results
Party	Candidate	Votes	%
Republican	Jim Pillen	91,459	33.9%
Republican	Charles Herbster	80,642	29.9%
Republican	Brett Lindstrom	70,487	26.1%
Republican	Theresa Thibodeau	16,413	6.1%
Republican	Breland Ridenour	4,682	1.7%
Republican	Michael Connely	2,831	1.1%
Republican	Donna Nicole Carpenter	1,533	0.6%
Republican	Lela McNinch	1,192	0.4%
Republican	Troy Wentz	708	0.3%
Write-in		193	0.1%
Total votes		269,947	100.0%

Democratic primary results
Party	Candidate	Votes	%
Democratic	Carol Blood	88,802	87.0%
Democratic	Roy Harris	11,264	11.3%
Write-in		1,574	1.7%
Total votes		100,066	100.0%

2022 Nebraska gubernatorial election
Party	Candidate	Votes	%	±%
Republican	Jim Pillen; Joe Kelly	398,334	59.74%	+0.74
Democratic	Carol Blood; Al Davis	242,006	36.29%	−4.71
Libertarian	Scott Zimmerman; Jason Blumenthal	26,445	3.97%	N/A
Total votes		666,795	100.00%	
Turnout		682,716	54.93%	
Registered electors		1,242,930		
Republican hold				

== Nevada ==
Nevada gubernatorial election
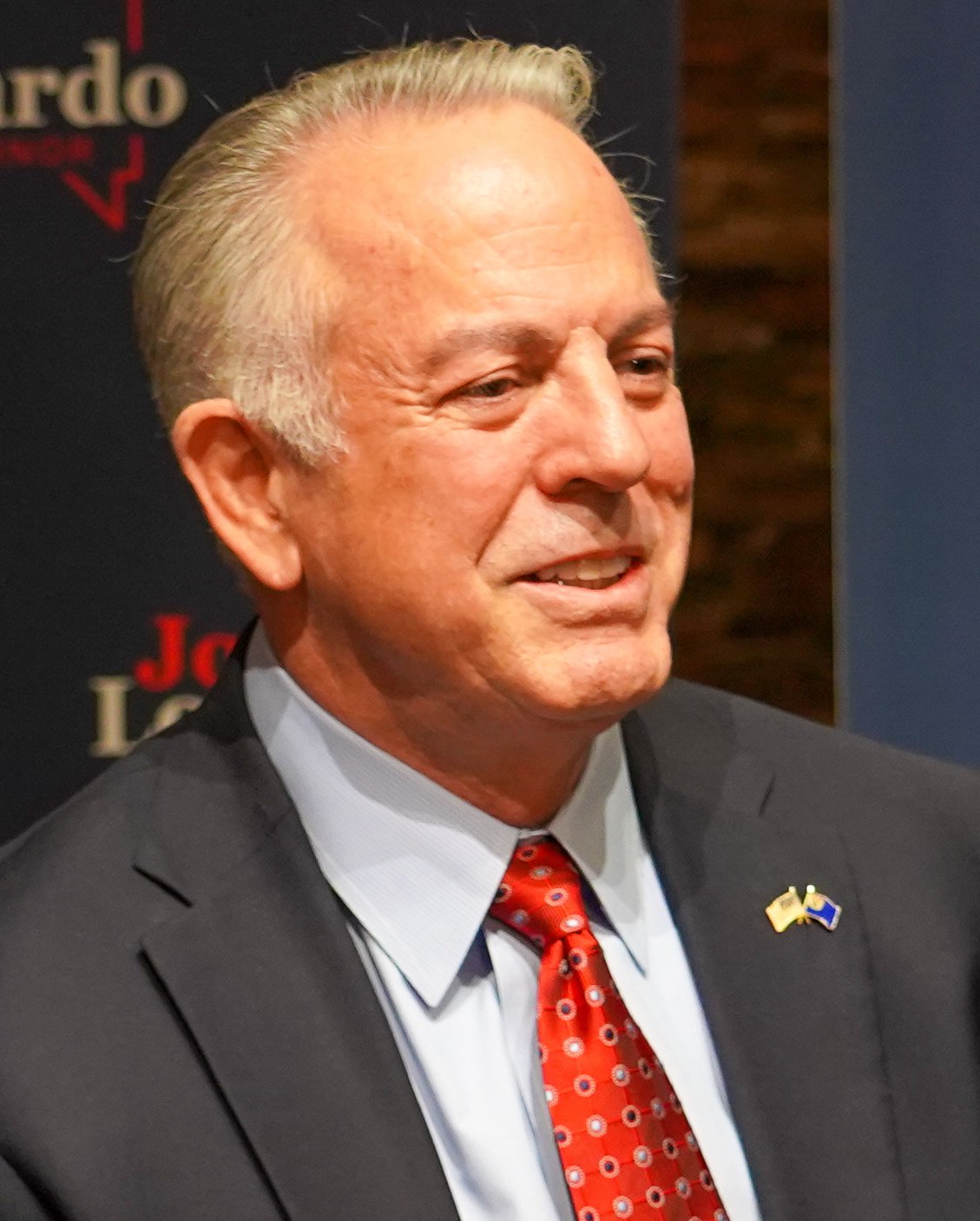

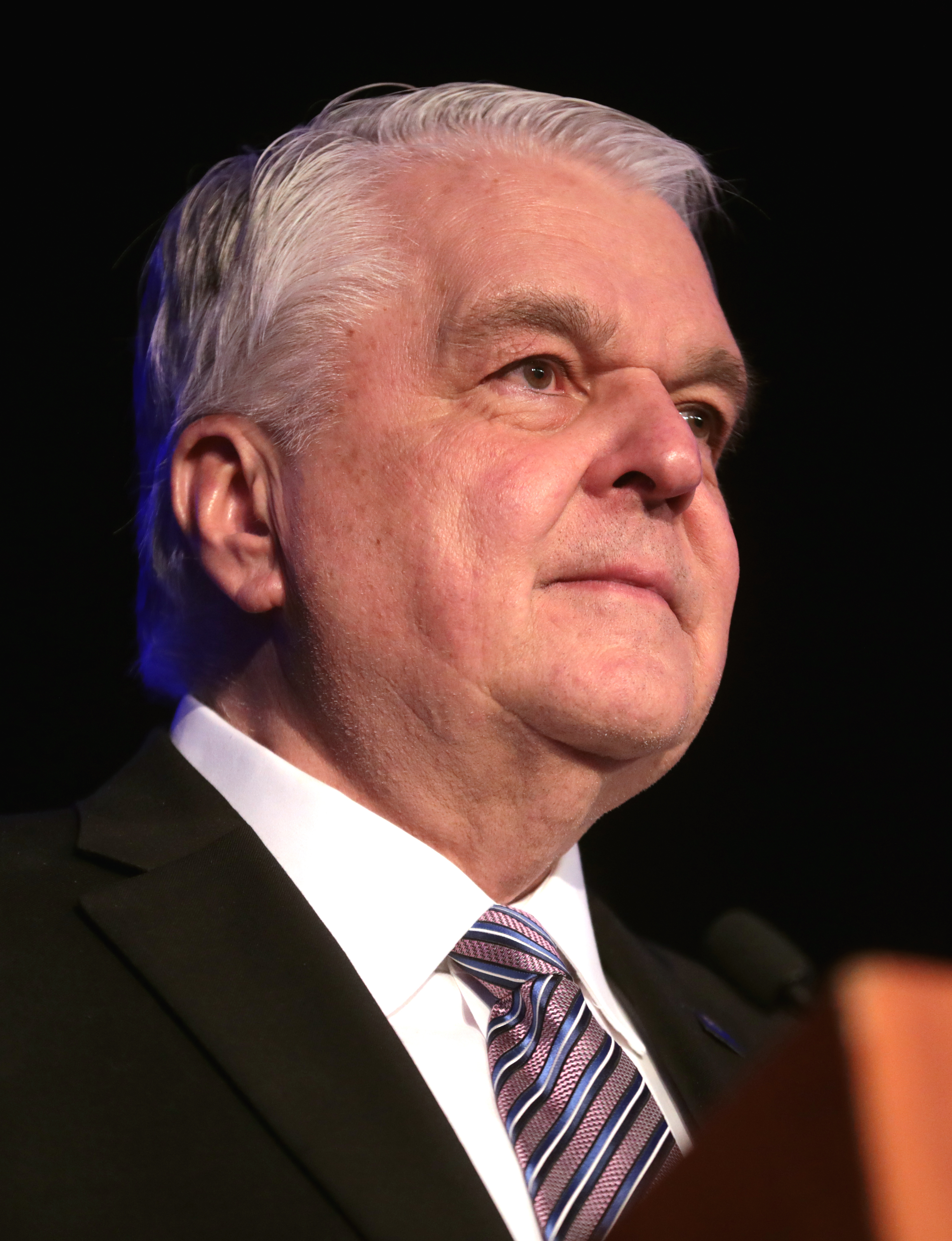
Nominee	Joe Lombardo	Steve Sisolak
Party	Republican	Democratic
Popular vote	497,377	481,991
Percentage	48.81%	47.30%
- County results Lombardo: 50–60% 60–70% 70–80% 80–90% Sisolak: 40–50% 50–60%
Governor before election
Steve Sisolak
Democratic
Elected Governor
Joe Lombardo
Republican

Incumbent governor Steve Sisolak, a Democrat, was elected in 2018 with 49.4% of the vote and ran for re-election to a second term. Sisolak lost re-election to a second term, being defeated by Republican nominee and Clark County Sheriff, Joe Lombardo.

Sisolak was the first Democrat to seek re-election to Nevada's governorship since Bob Miller in 1994, and was subsequently the only incumbent governor in the United States to lose re-election in the 2022 elections. Decision Desk HQ called the race for Lombardo on November 11. Amid a slate of failed gubernatorial pickup attempts, this was the only governorship Republicans flipped in the 2022 elections, as well as the only governorship in a state carried by one party in the prior presidential election to flip to the other party. This was also the first time since Pat Quinn's defeat in the 2014 Illinois gubernatorial election that an incumbent Democratic governor had lost re-election.

Former senator Dean Heller ran for the Republican nomination as did North Las Vegas Mayor John Lee, and Clark County Sheriff Joe Lombardo. Lombardo won the Republican primary and faced Sisolak in November.

Democratic primary results
Party	Candidate	Votes	%
Democratic	Steve Sisolak (incumbent)	157,283	89.53%
Democratic	Tom Collins	12,051	6.86%
None of These Candidates		6,340	3.61%
Total votes		175,674	100.0%

Republican primary results
Party	Candidate	Votes	%
Republican	Joe Lombardo	87,761	38.40%
Republican	Joey Gilbert	61,738	27.01%
Republican	Dean Heller	32,087	14.04%
Republican	John Jay Lee	17,846	7.81%
Republican	Guy Nohra	8,348	3.65%
Republican	Fred J. Simon	6,856	3.00%
Republican	Thomas Heck	4,315	1.89%
None of These Candidates		4,219	1.85%
Republican	Eddie Hamilton	1,293	0.57%
Republican	Amber Whitley	1,238	0.54%
Republican	William Walls	833	0.36%
Republican	Gary Evertsen	558	0.24%
Republican	Seven Achilles Evans	475	0.21%
Republican	Edward O'Brien	422	0.18%
Republican	Barak Zilberberg	352	0.15%
Republican	Stanleigh Lusak	229	0.10%
Total votes		228,570	100.0%

2022 Nevada gubernatorial election
Party	Candidate	Votes	%	±%
Republican	Joe Lombardo	497,377	48.81%	+3.50%
Democratic	Steve Sisolak (incumbent)	481,991	47.30%	−2.09%
Libertarian	Brandon Davis	14,919	1.46%	+0.57%
None of These Candidates		14,866	1.46%	−0.48%
Independent American	Ed Bridges	9,918	0.97%	−0.07%
Total votes		1,019,071	100.0%	
Turnout		1,023,617	54.58%	
Registered electors		1,875,578		
Republican gain from Democratic				

== New Hampshire ==
2022 New Hampshire gubernatorial election
- November 8, 2022
- Turnout: 67.63% ▼
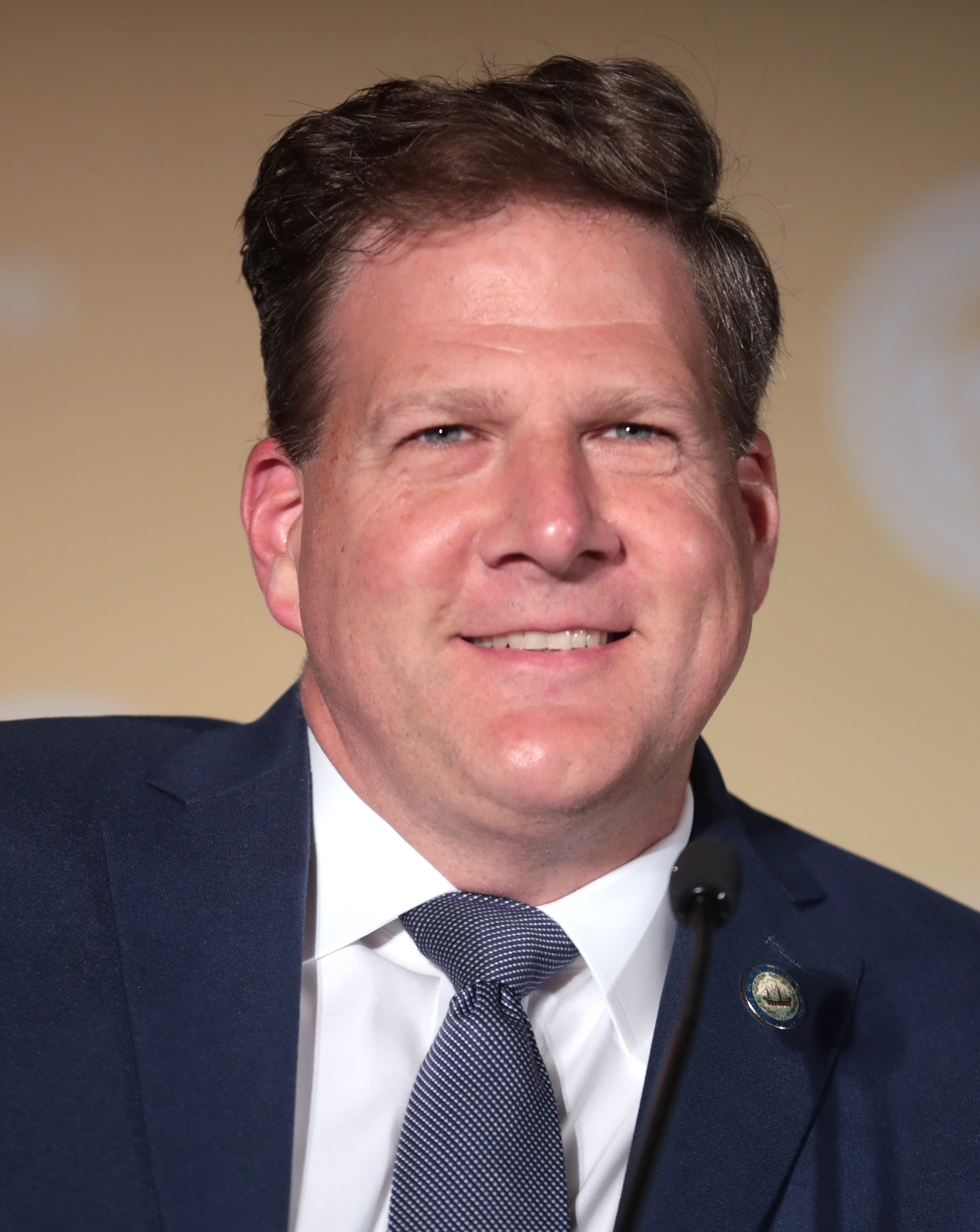
Nominee	Chris Sununu	Tom Sherman
Party	Republican	Democratic
Popular vote	352,982	256,774
Percentage	56.98%	41.47%
- Sununu: 40–50% 50–60% 60–70% 70–80% 80–90% >90% Sherman: 40–50% 50–60% 60–70% 70–80% >90%
Governor before election
Chris Sununu
Republican
Elected Governor
Chris Sununu
Republican

Incumbent Republican governor Chris Sununu was re-elected in 2020 with 65.1% of the vote and ran for a fourth term. Physician Tom Sherman challenged Sununu as a Democrat. Chris Sununu won re-election to a fourth term.

Republican primary results
Party	Candidate	Votes	%
Republican	Chris Sununu (incumbent)	113,443	78.66%
Republican	Karen Testerman	14,473	10.04%
Republican	Thaddeus Riley	11,107	7.70%
Republican	Julian Acciard	2,906	2.01%
Republican	Jay Lewis	1,318	0.91%
Republican	Richard McMenamon II	817	0.57%
Write-in		160	0.11%
Total votes		144,224	100.0%

Democratic primary results
Party	Candidate	Votes	%
Democratic	Tom Sherman	82,607	97.57%
Republican	Chris Sununu (incumbent) (write-in)	1,963	2.32%
Write-in		95	0.11%
Total votes		84,665	100.0%

2022 New Hampshire gubernatorial election
Party	Candidate	Votes	%	±%
Republican	Chris Sununu (incumbent)	352,813	56.98%	−8.14%
Democratic	Tom Sherman	256,766	41.47%	+8.11%
Libertarian	Kelly Halldorson	5,071	0.82%	N/A
Libertarian	Karlyn Borysenko	2,772	0.45%	N/A
Write-in		1,713	0.28%	+0.19%
Total votes		619,135	100.0%	
Turnout		626,845	67.63%	
Registered electors		925,401		
Republican hold				

== New Mexico ==
New Mexico gubernatorial election
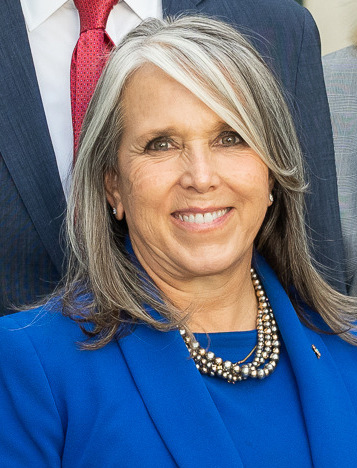

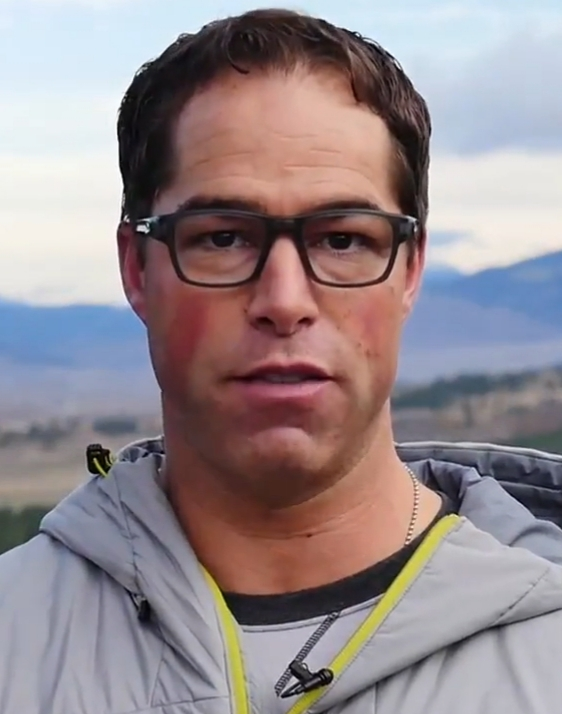
Nominee	Michelle Lujan Grisham	Mark Ronchetti
Party	Democratic	Republican
Running mate	Howie Morales	Ant Thornton
Popular vote	370,168	324,701
Percentage	51.97%	45.59%
- County results Lujan Grisham: 50–60% 60–70% 70–80% Ronchetti: 40–50% 50–60% 60–70% 70–80% 80–90%
Governor before election
Michelle Lujan Grisham
Democratic
Elected Governor
Michelle Lujan Grisham
Democratic

Governor Michelle Lujan Grisham was elected in 2018 with 57.2% of the vote and ran for a second term. The Republican nominee was former meteorologist Mark Ronchetti. Incumbent Democratic governor Michelle Lujan Grisham won a second term. She was first elected in 2018 with 57.2% of the vote. This was the first gubernatorial election in New Mexico since 1986 in which the winner was from the same party as the incumbent president, and the first time since 1978 that a Democrat accomplished this feat.

Gubernatorial Democratic primary results
Party	Candidate	Votes	%
Democratic	Michelle Lujan Grisham (incumbent)	125,238	100.0%
Total votes		125,238	100.0%

Gubernatorial Republican primary results
Party	Candidate	Votes	%
Republican	Mark Ronchetti	68,658	58.41%
Republican	Rebecca Dow	18,185	15.47%
Republican	Gregory Zanetti	16,394	13.95%
Republican	Jay Block	12,469	10.61%
Republican	Ethel Maharg	1,845	1.57%
Total votes		117,551	100.0%

2022 New Mexico gubernatorial election
Party	Candidate	Votes	%	±%
Democratic	Michelle Lujan Grisham (incumbent); Howie Morales (incumbent)	370,168	51.97%	−5.23%
Republican	Mark Ronchetti; Ant Thornton	324,701	45.59%	+2.79%
Libertarian	Karen Bedonie; Efren Gallardo Jr.	17,387	2.44%	N/A
Total votes		712,256	100.0%	
Turnout		714,797	52.38%	
Registered electors		1,364,559		
Democratic hold				

== New York ==
New York gubernatorial election
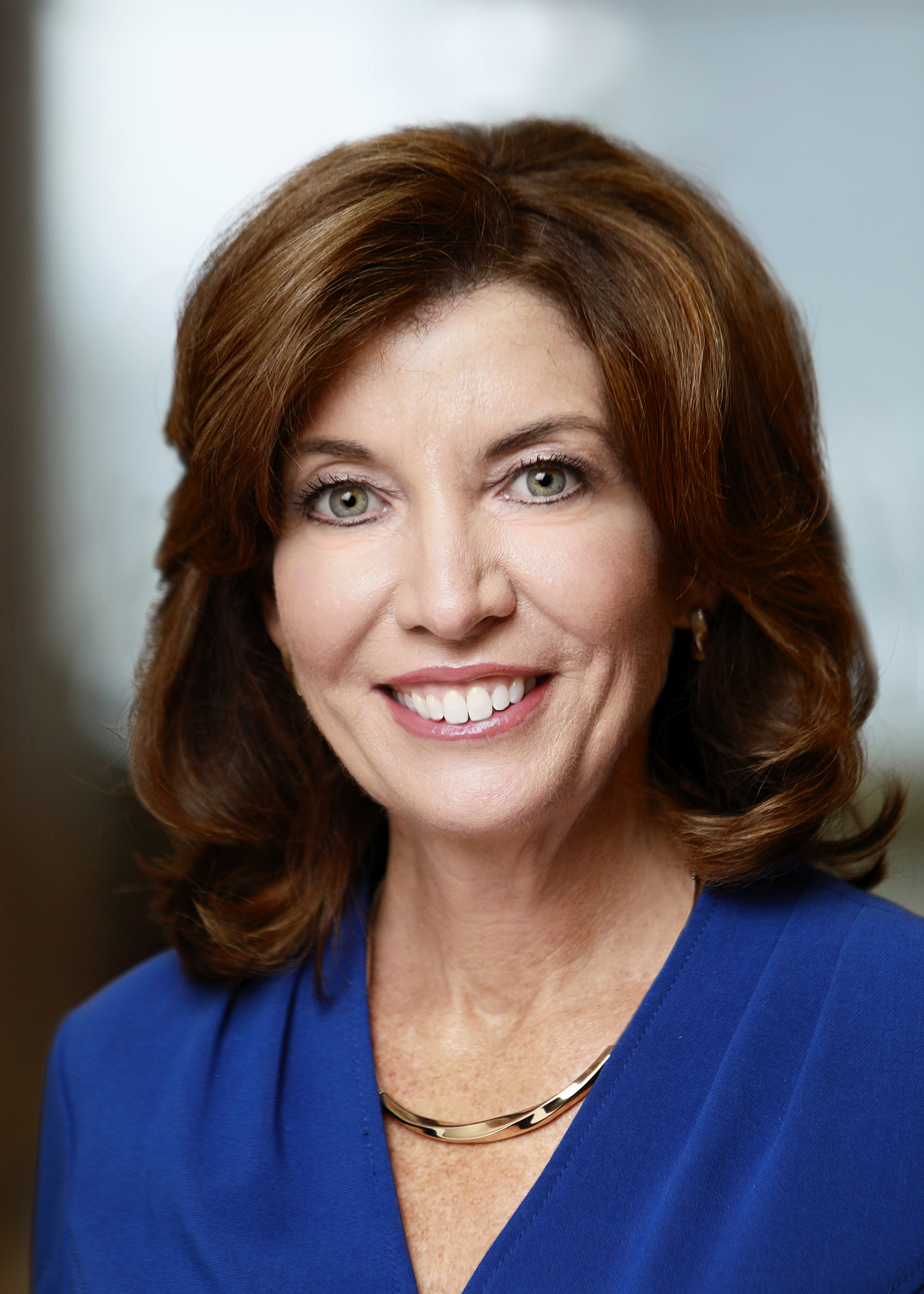

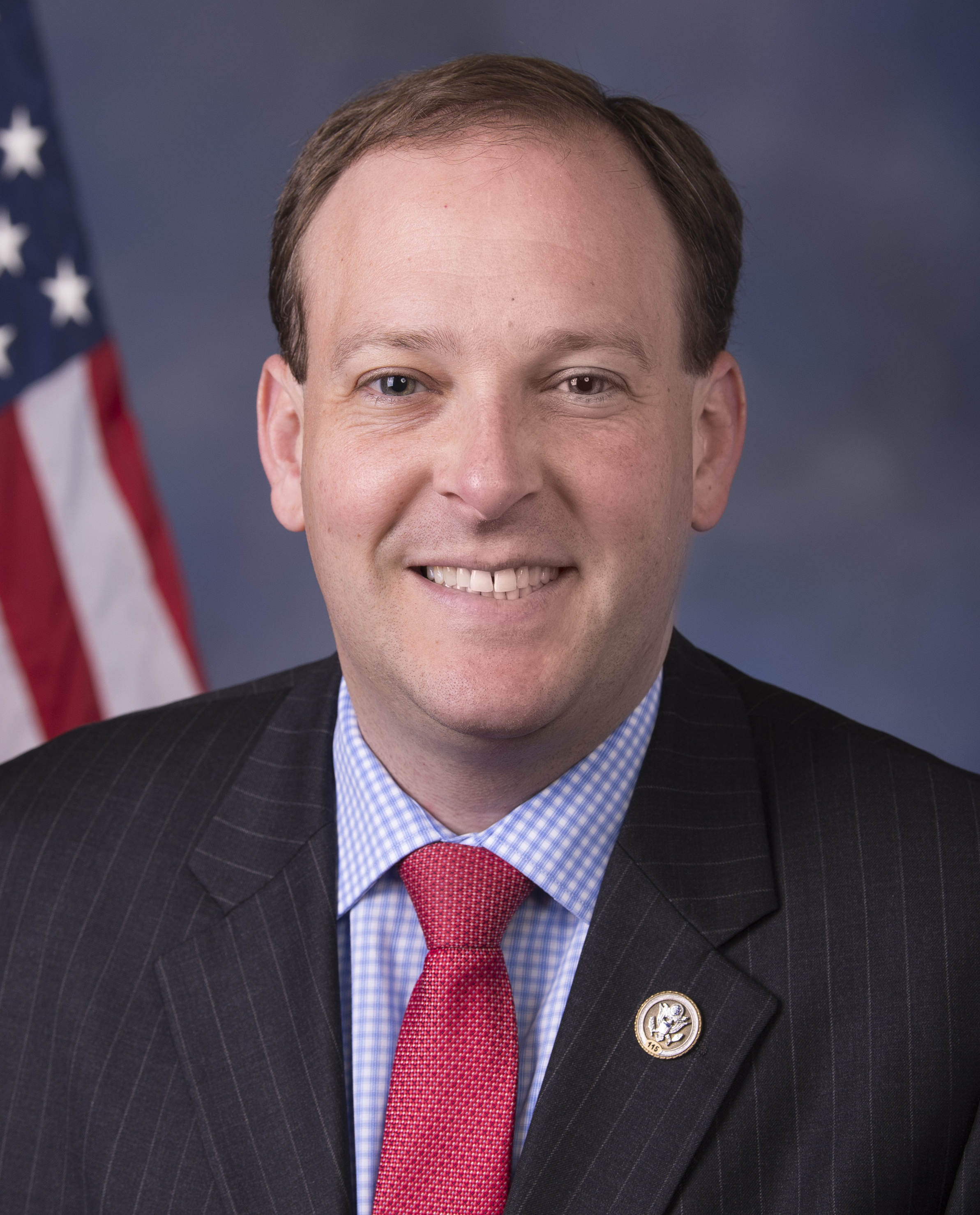
Nominee	Kathy Hochul	Lee Zeldin
Party	Democratic	Republican
Running mate	Antonio Delgado	Alison Esposito
Popular vote	3,140,415	2,762,581
Percentage	53.20%	46.80%
- County results Hochul: 50-60% 60-70% 70-80% 80-90% Zeldin: 50-60% 60-70% 70-80% 80-90%
Governor before election
Kathy Hochul
Democratic
Elected Governor
Kathy Hochul
Democratic

Governor Andrew Cuomo was re-elected to a third term in 2018 with 59.6% of the vote. Because New York does not have gubernatorial term limits in its Constitution, he was eligible to run for re-election for a fourth term. On May 28, 2019, Cuomo announced that he would run for re-election for a fourth term in 2022.

Cuomo was expected to face a primary challenge for the Democratic nomination as a result of allegations of sexual harassment involving Cuomo and a simultaneous investigation into his administration's cover-up of nursing home deaths during the COVID-19 pandemic. Cuomo resigned as governor at the end of August 23, 2021, upon which Lieutenant Governor Kathy Hochul became governor. Hochul has said she is running for a full gubernatorial term. Current New York Attorney General Letitia James was previously running against Hochul in the primary, but later changed her mind to run for re-election. Current New York City Public Advocate Jumaane Williams announced he would run against Hochul in the primary, as did current U.S. representative Thomas Suozzi. Hochul won the primary on June 28.

Republicans running for the gubernatorial nomination included former Westchester County executive Rob Astorino, Andrew Giuliani (the son of former New York City mayor Rudy Giuliani), businessman and former Obama administration official Harry Wilson, and congressman and former state senator Lee Zeldin. Zeldin is the official designee of both the New York Republican Party and the New York Conservative Party. Zeldin won the primary on June 28.

Larry Shape is the Libertarian candidate for governor. The state board of elections disqualified him for not meeting ballot access requirements. He continued as a write in candidate. He was also the Libertarian nominee in the 2018 election.

Democratic gubernatorial primary results
Party	Candidate	Votes	%
Democratic	Kathy Hochul (incumbent)	607,928	67.64%
Democratic	Jumaane Williams	173,872	19.35%
Democratic	Thomas Suozzi	116,972	13.01%
Total votes		898,772	100.0%

Republican gubernatorial primary results
Party	Candidate	Votes	%
Republican	Lee Zeldin	196,874	43.62%
Republican	Andrew Giuliani	103,267	22.88%
Republican	Rob Astorino	84,464	18.71%
Republican	Harry Wilson	66,736	14.79%
Total votes		451,341	100.0%

2022 New York gubernatorial election
Party	Candidate	Votes	%	±%
Democratic	Kathy Hochul; Antonio Delgado	2,879,092	48.77%	−7.39%
Working Families	Kathy Hochul; Antonio Delgado	261,323	4.43%	+2.55%
Total	Kathy Hochul (incumbent); Antonio Delgado (incumbent)	3,140,415	53.20%	−6.42%
Republican	Lee Zeldin; Alison Esposito	2,449,394	41.49%	+9.89%
Conservative	Lee Zeldin; Alison Esposito	313,187	5.31%	+1.15%
Total	Lee Zeldin; Alison Esposito	2,762,581	46.80%	+10.59%
Total votes		5,902,996	100.0%	
Turnout		5,788,802	47.74%	
Registered electors		12,124,242		
Democratic hold				

== Ohio ==
Ohio gubernatorial election
- November 8, 2022
- Turnout: 52.32% ▼5.2pp
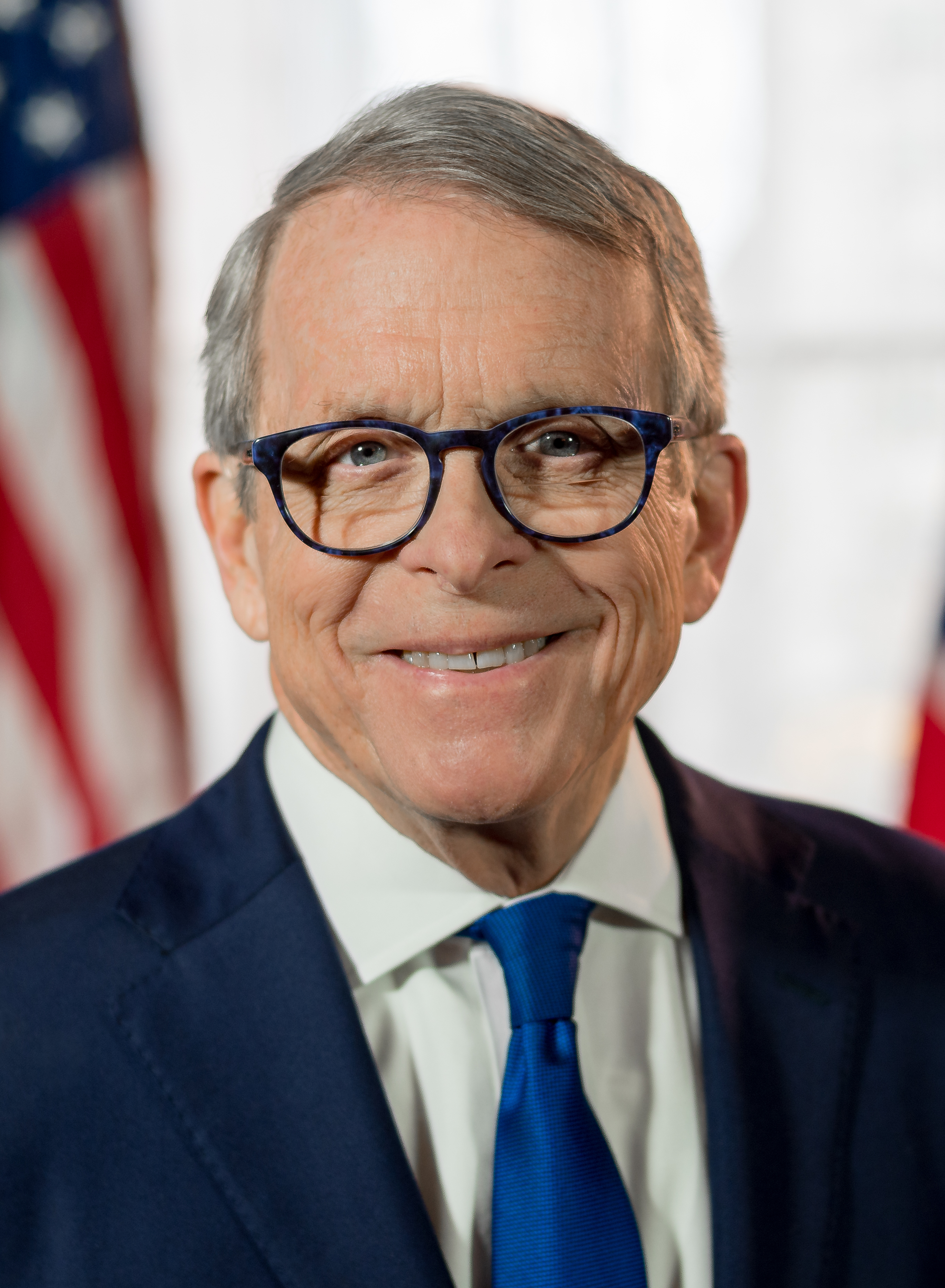

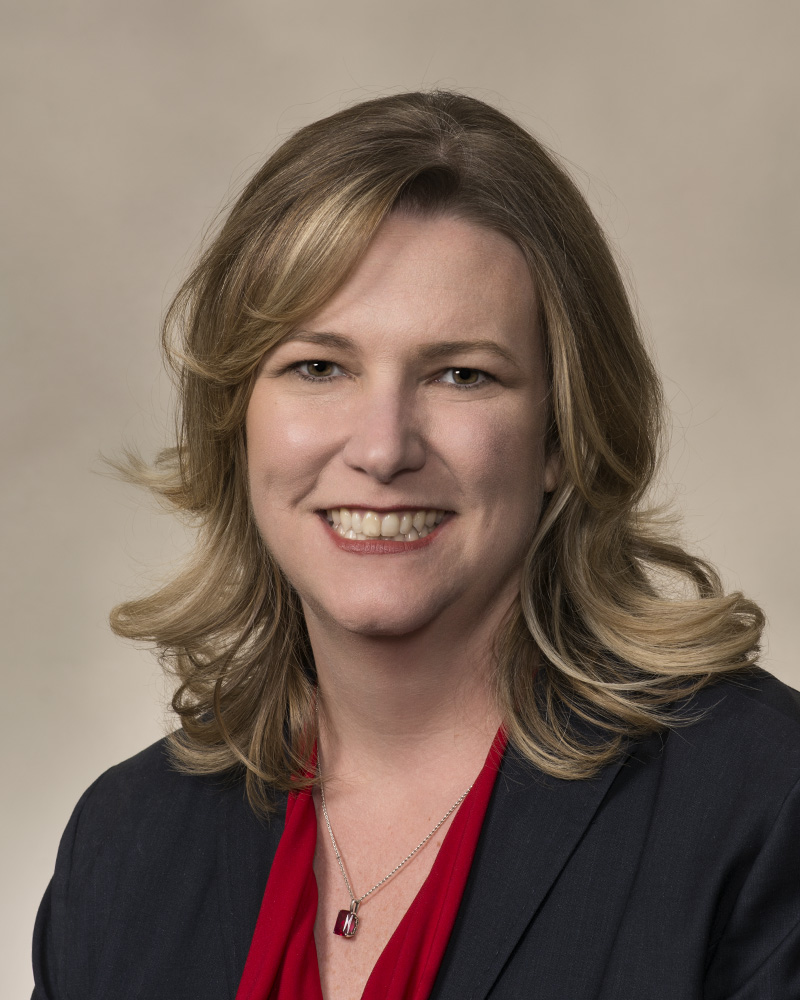
Nominee	Mike DeWine	Nan Whaley
Party	Republican	Democratic
Running mate	Jon Husted	Cheryl Stephens
Popular vote	2,580,424	1,545,489
Percentage	62.41%	37.38%
- DeWine: 50–60% 60–70% 70–80% 80–90% Whaley: 50–60% 60–70%
Governor before election
Mike DeWine
Republican
Elected Governor
Mike DeWine
Republican

Governor Mike DeWine was elected in 2018 with 50.4% of the vote and ran for re-election to a second term.

DeWine faced a primary challenge from former US Representative and 2018 Ohio Republican Senate Nominee Jim Renacci and farmer Joe Blystone. Former Dayton Mayor Nan Whaley and former Cincinnati Mayor John Cranley ran for the Democratic nomination. DeWine and Whaley won their respective primaries on May 3.

Incumbent Republican governor Mike DeWine won re-election to a second term in a landslide, defeating Democratic nominee Nan Whaley, the former mayor of Dayton, 62.8% to 37.2%. DeWine's 25-point victory marked the continuation of a trend in which every incumbent Republican governor of Ohio since 1978 has won re-election by a double digit margin.

This was the first time since 1994 in which Trumbull and Mahoning counties have gone to the Republican candidate with over 60% of the vote.

Republican primary results
Party	Candidate	Votes	%
Republican	Mike DeWine (incumbent); Jon Husted (incumbent)	519,594	48.11%
Republican	Jim Renacci; Joe Knopp	302,494	28.01%
Republican	Joe Blystone; Jeremiah Workman	235,584	21.81%
Republican	Ron Hood; Candice Keller	22,411	2.07%
Total votes		1,080,083	100.0%

Democratic primary results
Party	Candidate	Votes	%
Democratic	Nan Whaley; Cheryl Stephens	331,014	65.01%
Democratic	John Cranley; Teresa Fedor	178,132	34.99%
Total votes		509,146	100.0%

2022 Ohio gubernatorial election
Party	Candidate	Votes	%	±%
Republican	Mike DeWine (incumbent); Jon Husted (incumbent)	2,580,424	62.41%	+12.02%
Democratic	Nan Whaley; Cheryl Stephens	1,545,489	37.38%	−9.30%
Write-in		8,964	0.22%	N/A
Total votes		4,134,877	100.0%	
Turnout		4,201,368	52.32%	
Registered electors		8,029,950		
Republican hold				

== Oklahoma ==
Oklahoma gubernatorial election
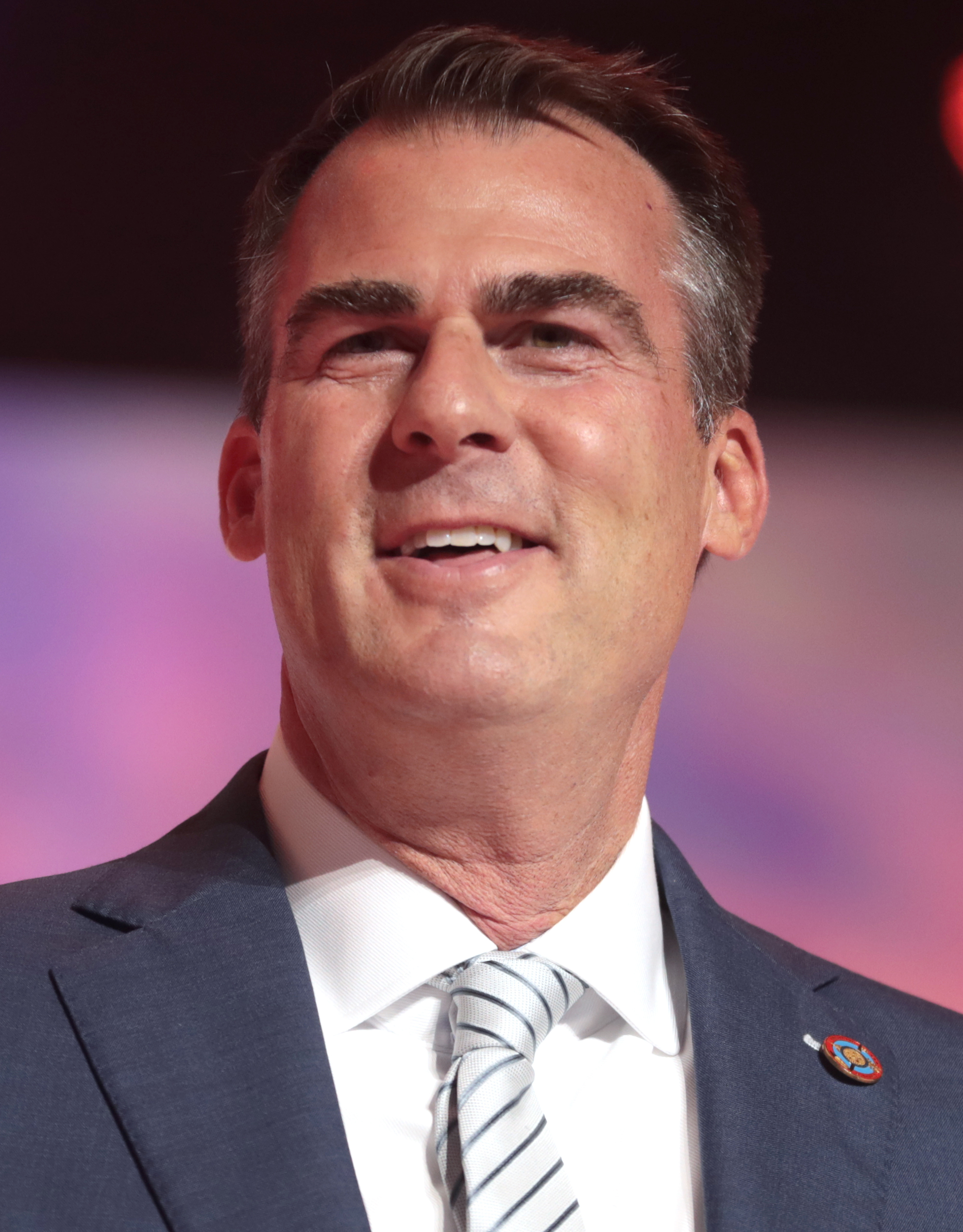

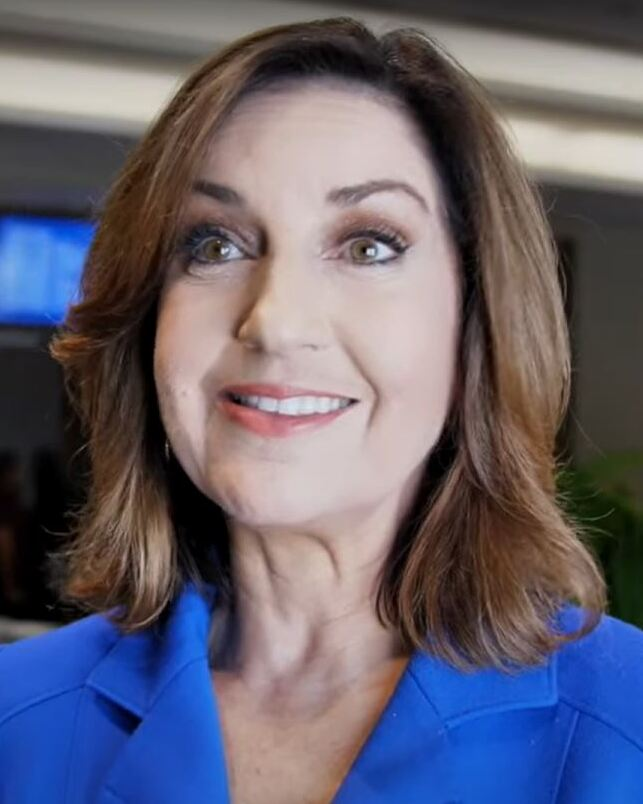
Nominee	Kevin Stitt	Joy Hofmeister
Party	Republican	Democratic
Popular vote	639,484	481,904
Percentage	55.45%	41.79%
- Stitt: 40–50% 50–60% 60–70% 70–80% 80–90% Hofmeister: 40–50% 50–60%
Governor before election
Kevin Stitt
Republican
Elected Governor
Kevin Stitt
Republican

Governor Kevin Stitt was elected in 2018 with 54.3% of the vote and ran for re-election to a second term. Former state senator and physician Ervin Yen filed paperwork to challenge Stitt in the Republican Primary. Stitt won the primary on June 28.

On October 7, 2021, Oklahoma Superintendent of Public Instruction Joy Hofmeister announced she would be switching to the Democratic Party and subsequently announced her campaign for the Democratic nomination for governor. Hofmeister won the nomination on June 28, defeating former state senator Connie Johnson in the primary. Natalie Bruno has filed to run for the Libertarian Party's nomination. Paul Tay has filed with the state ethics commission to run as an independent.

Incumbent Republican governor Kevin Stitt was re-elected to a second term. State Superintendent of Public Instruction Joy Hofmeister was the Democratic nominee, former Republican state senator Ervin Yen ran as an independent, and Natalie Bruno was the Libertarian nominee.

Although Stitt won by a comfortable margin, his performance was the worst of any 2022 Republican candidate for statewide office in Oklahoma. Meanwhile, Hofmeister's performance was the second best of any 2022 Democratic statewide candidate in Oklahoma, only behind State Superintendent of Public Instruction nominee Jena Nelson.

Republican primary results
Party	Candidate	Votes	%
Republican	Kevin Stitt (incumbent)	248,525	69.06%
Republican	Joel Kintsel	51,587	14.33%
Republican	Mark Sherwood	47,713	13.26%
Republican	Moira McCabe	12,046	3.35%
Total votes		359,871	100.0%

Democratic primary results
Party	Candidate	Votes	%
Democratic	Joy Hofmeister	101,913	60.73%
Democratic	Connie Johnson	65,894	39.27%
Total votes		167,807	100.0%

2022 Oklahoma gubernatorial election
Party	Candidate	Votes	%	±%
Republican	Kevin Stitt (incumbent)	639,484	55.45%	+1.12%
Democratic	Joy Hofmeister	481,904	41.79%	−0.44%
Libertarian	Natalie Bruno	16,243	1.41%	−2.03%
Independent	Ervin Yen	15,653	1.36%	N/A
Total votes		1,153,284	100.0%	
Turnout		1,153,284	50.23%	
Registered electors		2,295,906		
Republican hold				

== Oregon ==
Oregon gubernatorial election
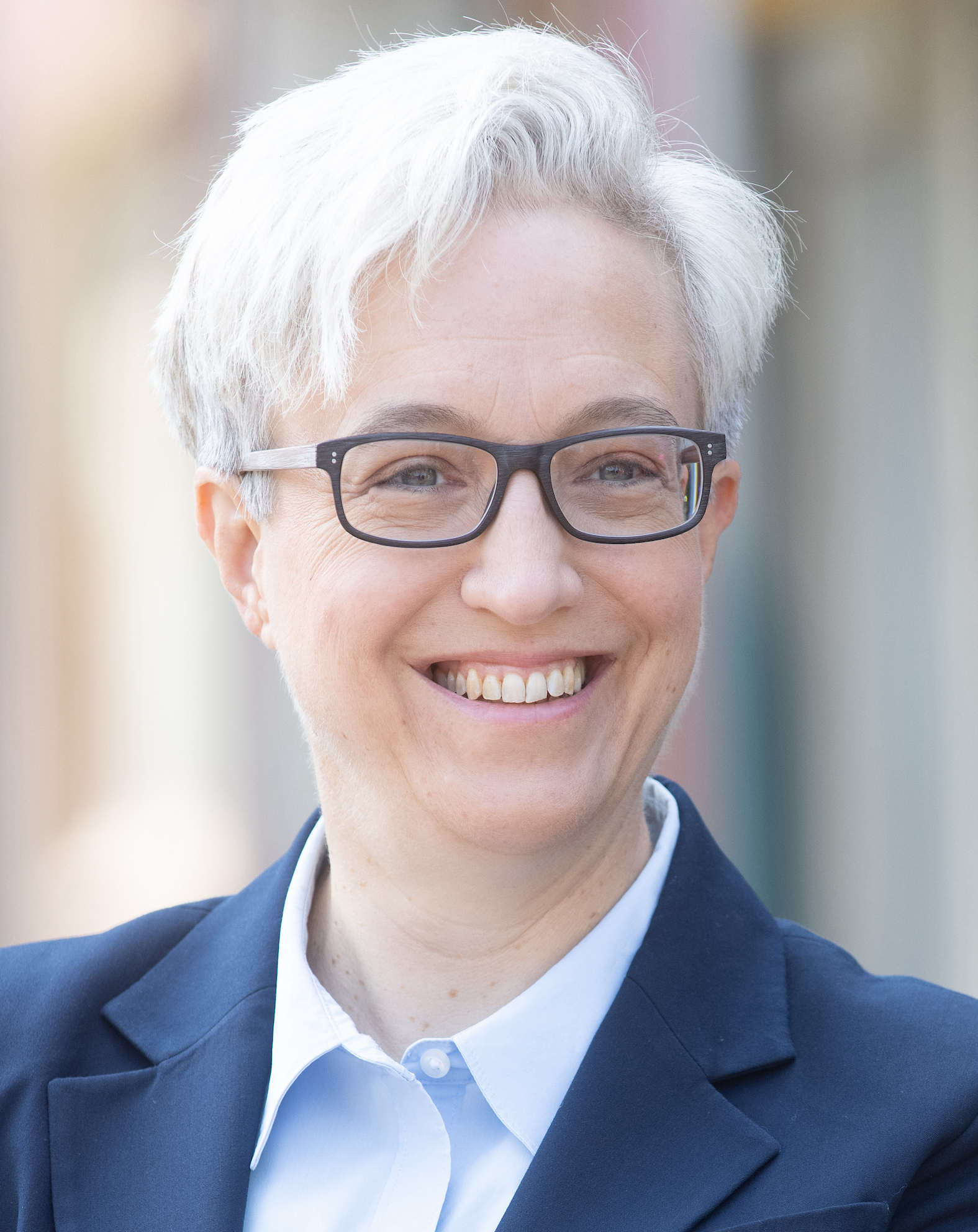

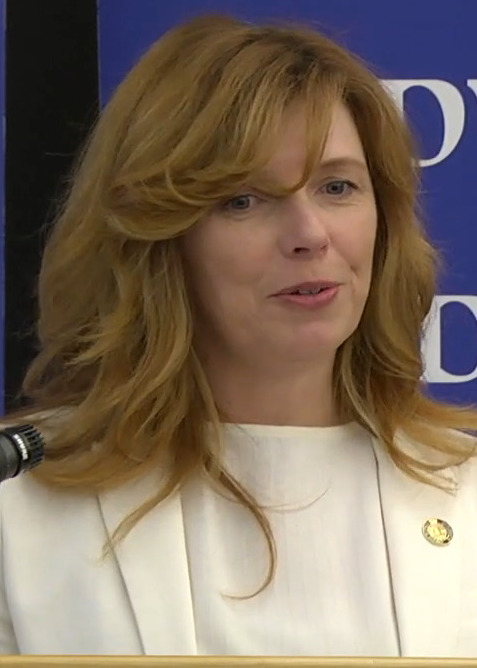

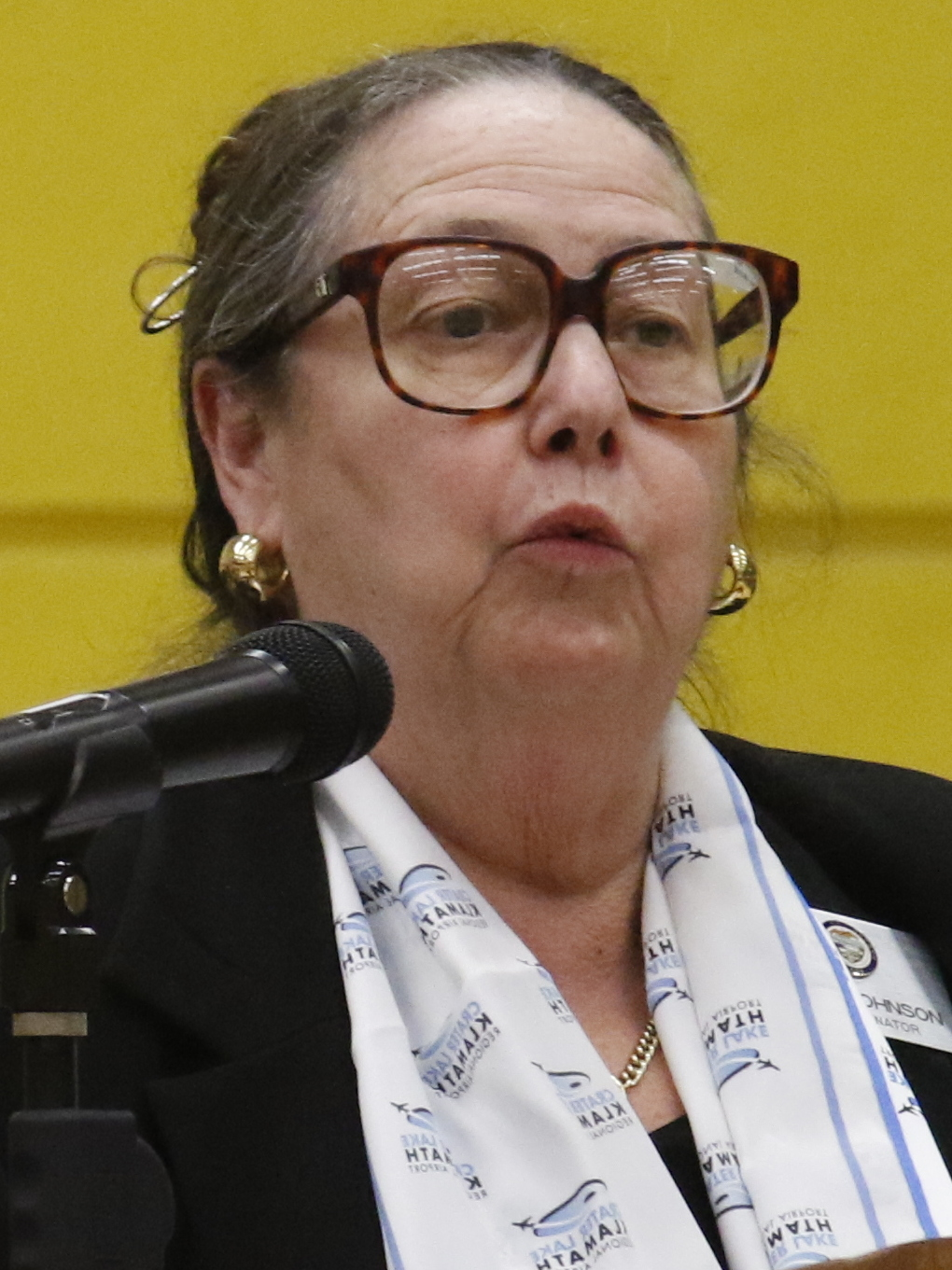
Nominee	Tina Kotek	Christine Drazan	Betsy Johnson
Party	Democratic	Republican	Independent
Popular vote	917,074	850,347	168,431
Percentage	47.0%	43.6%	8.6%
- County results Kotek: 30–40% 40–50% 50–60% 70–80% Drazan: 40–50% 50–60% 60–70% 70–80% 80–90%
Governor before election
Kate Brown
Democratic
Elected Governor
Tina Kotek
Democratic

The incumbent governor, Democrat Kate Brown, took office on February 18, 2015, upon the resignation of John Kitzhaber. She was subsequently elected in the gubernatorial special election in 2016, and was re-elected to a full term in 2018. Due to term limits, she was ineligible for re-election in 2022.

The Oregonian anticipated the election to have "the first competitive Democratic primary in more than a decade and potentially the closest such race since 2002." Willamette Week anticipated a "wide open field of Democrats", citing the lack of an incumbent. Almost 20 Republican candidates ran for the office, including two previous nominees for governor in 1998 and 2016, as well as 15 Democrats and some non-affiliates/third-party members.

In the May 17 primary elections, former Oregon House Speaker Tina Kotek was declared the winner of the Democratic primary half an hour after the ballot deadline. The next day, former House Minority Leader Christine Drazan was determined to have won the Republican primary. Notably, the general election featured three prominent female candidates, including former state senator Betsy Johnson, who was a moderate Democrat, running as an independent.

Oregon was considered a possible Republican pickup, as Brown had the lowest approval rating of any governor in the United States at the time and Johnson could have siphoned votes from Kotek. Nonetheless, Kotek won the election by a slim margin, becoming Oregon's 7th consecutive Democratic governor. She became one of the first lesbian governors in the United States, along with Maura Healey in Massachusetts.

Democratic primary results
Party	Candidate	Votes	%
Democratic	Tina Kotek	275,301	57.63%
Democratic	Tobias Read	156,017	32.66%
Democratic	Patrick Starnes	10,524	2.20%
Democratic	George Carrillo	9,365	1.96%
Democratic	Michael Trimble	5,000	1.05%
Democratic	John Sweeney	4,193	0.88%
Democratic	Julian Bell	3,926	0.82%
Democratic	Wilson Bright	2,316	0.48%
Democratic	Dave Stauffer	2,302	0.48%
Democratic	Ifeanyichukwu Diru	1,780	0.37%
Democratic	Keisha Marchant	1,755	0.37%
Democratic	Genevieve Wilson	1,588	0.33%
Democratic	Michael Cross	1,342	0.28%
Democratic	David Beem	1,308	0.27%
Democratic	Peter Hall	982	0.21%
Total votes		477,699	100.0%

Republican primary results
Party	Candidate	Votes	%
Republican	Christine Drazan	85,255	22.99%
Republican	Bob Tiernan	66,089	17.82%
Republican	Stan Pulliam	41,123	11.09%
Republican	Bridget Barton	40,886	11.02%
Republican	Bud Pierce	32,965	8.89%
Republican	Marc Thielman	30,076	8.12%
Republican	Kerry McQuisten	28,727	7.74%
Republican	Bill Sizemore	13,261	3.57%
Republican	Jessica Gomez	9,970	2.69%
Republican	Tim McCloud	4,400	1.19%
Republican	Nick Hess	4,287	1.15%
Republican	Court Boice	4,040	1.09%
Republican	Brandon Merritt	3,615	0.97%
Republican	Reed Christensen	3,042	0.82%
Republican	Amber Richardson	1,924	0.52%
Republican	Raymond Baldwin	459	0.12%
Republican	David Burch	406	0.11%
Republican	John Presco	174	0.05%
Republican	Stefan Strek	171	0.05%
Total votes		370,910	100.0%

2022 Oregon gubernatorial election
Party	Candidate	Votes	%	±%
Democratic	Tina Kotek	917,074	46.96%	−3.09%
Republican	Christine Drazan	850,347	43.54%	−0.11%
Independent	Betsy Johnson	168,431	8.63%	N/A
Constitution	Donice Noelle Smith	8,051	0.41%	−0.72%
Libertarian	R. Leon Noble	6,867	0.35%	−1.20%
Write-in		2,113	0.11%	−0.05%
Total votes		1,952,883	100.0%	
Turnout		1,997,689	66.91%	
Registered electors		2,985,820		
Democratic hold				

== Pennsylvania ==
Pennsylvania gubernatorial election
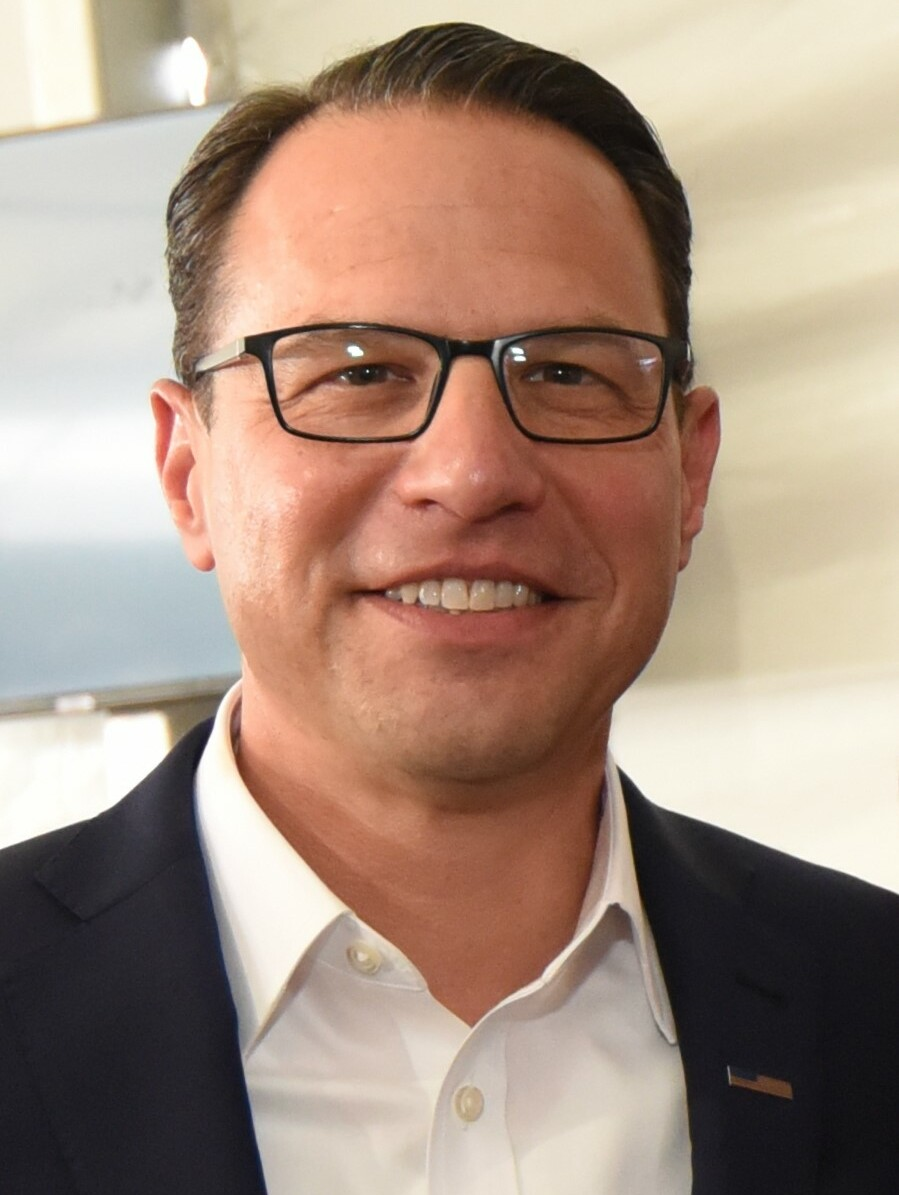

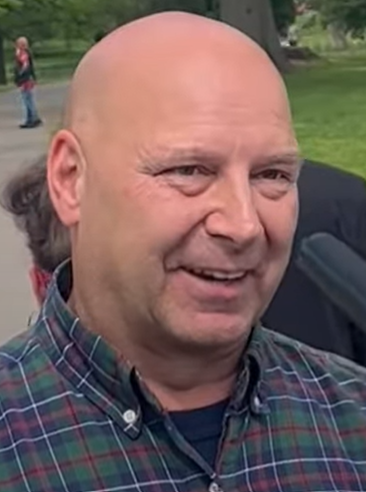
Nominee	Josh Shapiro	Doug Mastriano
Party	Democratic	Republican
Running mate	Austin Davis	Carrie DelRosso
Popular vote	3,031,137	2,238,477
Percentage	56.5%	41.7%
- County results Shapiro: 40–50% 50–60% 60–70% 70–80% 80–90% Mastriano: 40–50% 50–60% 60–70% 70–80% 80-90%
Governor before election
Tom Wolf
Democratic
Elected Governor
Josh Shapiro
Democratic

Governor Tom Wolf was re-elected in 2018 with 57.8% of the vote. He is term-limited in 2022 by the Pennsylvania Constitution and was therefore ineligible to seek election to a third consecutive term.

Democratic state attorney general Josh Shapiro defeated Republican state senator Doug Mastriano in a landslide victory to succeed term-limited incumbent Democratic governor Tom Wolf. Primaries were held on May 17, 2022. Shapiro won the Democratic nomination after running unopposed and Mastriano won the Republican nomination with 44% of the vote. Mastriano's nomination drew attention due to his far-right political views.

Shapiro defeated Mastriano by almost 15 points, a margin consistent with most polls. Shapiro scored the largest margin for a non-incumbent candidate for governor since 1946, and his victory marked the first time since 1844 that the Democratic Party won three consecutive gubernatorial elections in Pennsylvania. Shapiro also made history by earning the most votes of any gubernatorial candidate in the state's history, garnering just over three million votes. Austin Davis was elected lieutenant governor, and became the second African-American elected to statewide office in the state's history, following Republican Timothy DeFoor in 2020.

Shapiro's large margin of victory has been widely credited with helping down-ballot Democrats in concurrent elections.

Democratic primary
Party	Candidate	Votes	%
Democratic	Josh Shapiro	1,227,151	100.0%
Total votes		1,227,151	100.0%

Republican primary
Party	Candidate	Votes	%
Republican	Doug Mastriano	591,240	43.81%
Republican	Lou Barletta	273,252	20.25%
Republican	William McSwain	212,886	15.78%
Republican	Dave White	129,058	9.56%
Republican	Melissa Hart (withdrawn) (Note: Withdrew after deadline, remained on ballot)	54,752	4.06%
Republican	Joe Gale	27,920	2.07%
Republican	Jake Corman (withdrawn)	26,091	1.93%
Republican	Charlie Gerow	17,922	1.33%
Republican	Nche Zama	16,238	1.20%
Total votes		1,349,359	100.00%

2022 Pennsylvania gubernatorial election
Party	Candidate	Votes	%	±%
Democratic	Josh Shapiro; Austin Davis	3,031,137	56.49%	−1.28%
Republican	Doug Mastriano; Carrie DelRosso	2,238,477	41.71%	+1.01%
Libertarian	Matt Hackenburg; Tim McMaster	51,611	0.96%	−0.02%
Green	Christina DiGiulio; Michael Bagdes-Canning	24,436	0.46%	−0.09%
Keystone	Joe Soloski; Nicole Shultz	20,518	0.38%	N/A
Total votes		5,366,179	100.0%	N/A
Turnout			%	
Registered electors		8,864,831		
Democratic hold				

== Rhode Island ==
Rhode Island gubernatorial election
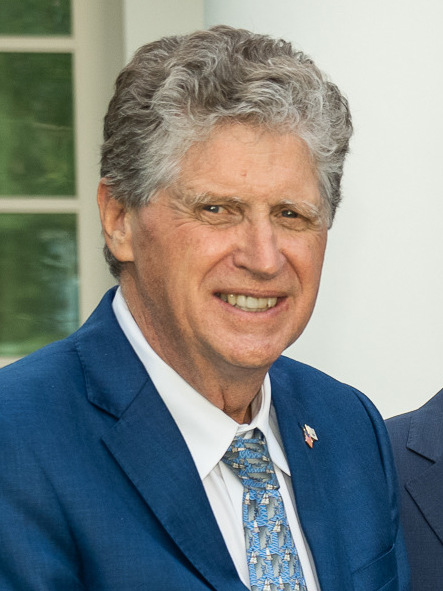

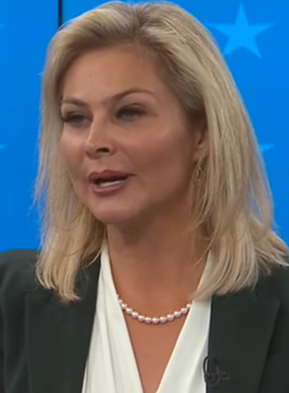
Nominee	Dan McKee	Ashley Kalus
Party	Democratic	Republican
Popular vote	207,166	139,001
Percentage	57.9%	38.9%
- McKee: 40–50% 50–60% 60–70% 70–80% 80–90% Kalus: 40–50% 50–60%
Governor before election
Dan McKee
Democratic
Elected Governor
Dan McKee
Democratic

Incumbent Democratic governor Dan McKee became Rhode Island's governor on March 2, 2021, when term-limited Gina Raimondo resigned following her confirmation as United States Secretary of Commerce. McKee easily won a full term on election day, defeating Republican Ashley Kalus by more than 19 percentage points.

McKee's margin of victory and vote share were the highest for any candidate for governor of Rhode Island since 1992.

Democratic primary results
Party	Candidate	Votes	%
Democratic	Dan McKee (incumbent)	37,288	32.8
Democratic	Helena Foulkes	33,931	29.9
Democratic	Nellie Gorbea	29,811	26.2
Democratic	Matt Brown	9,021	7.9
Democratic	Luis Daniel Muñoz	3,547	3.1
Total votes		113,598	100.0

Republican primary results
Party	Candidate	Votes	%
Republican	Ashley Kalus	17,188	83.7
Republican	Jonathan Riccitelli	3,351	16.3
Total votes		20,539	100.0

2022 Rhode Island gubernatorial election
Party	Candidate	Votes	%	±%
Democratic	Dan McKee (incumbent)	207,166	57.92%	+5.28
Republican	Ashley Kalus	139,001	38.86%	+1.68
Independent	Zachary Hurwitz	4,512	1.26%	N/A
Independent	Paul Rianna Jr.	3,123	0.87%	N/A
Libertarian	Elijah Gizzarelli	2,811	0.79%	N/A
Write-in		1,057	0.30%	−0.03
Total votes		357,670	100.00%	
Turnout			%	
Registered electors				
Democratic hold				

== South Carolina ==
South Carolina gubernatorial election
- Turnout: 50.86% ▼
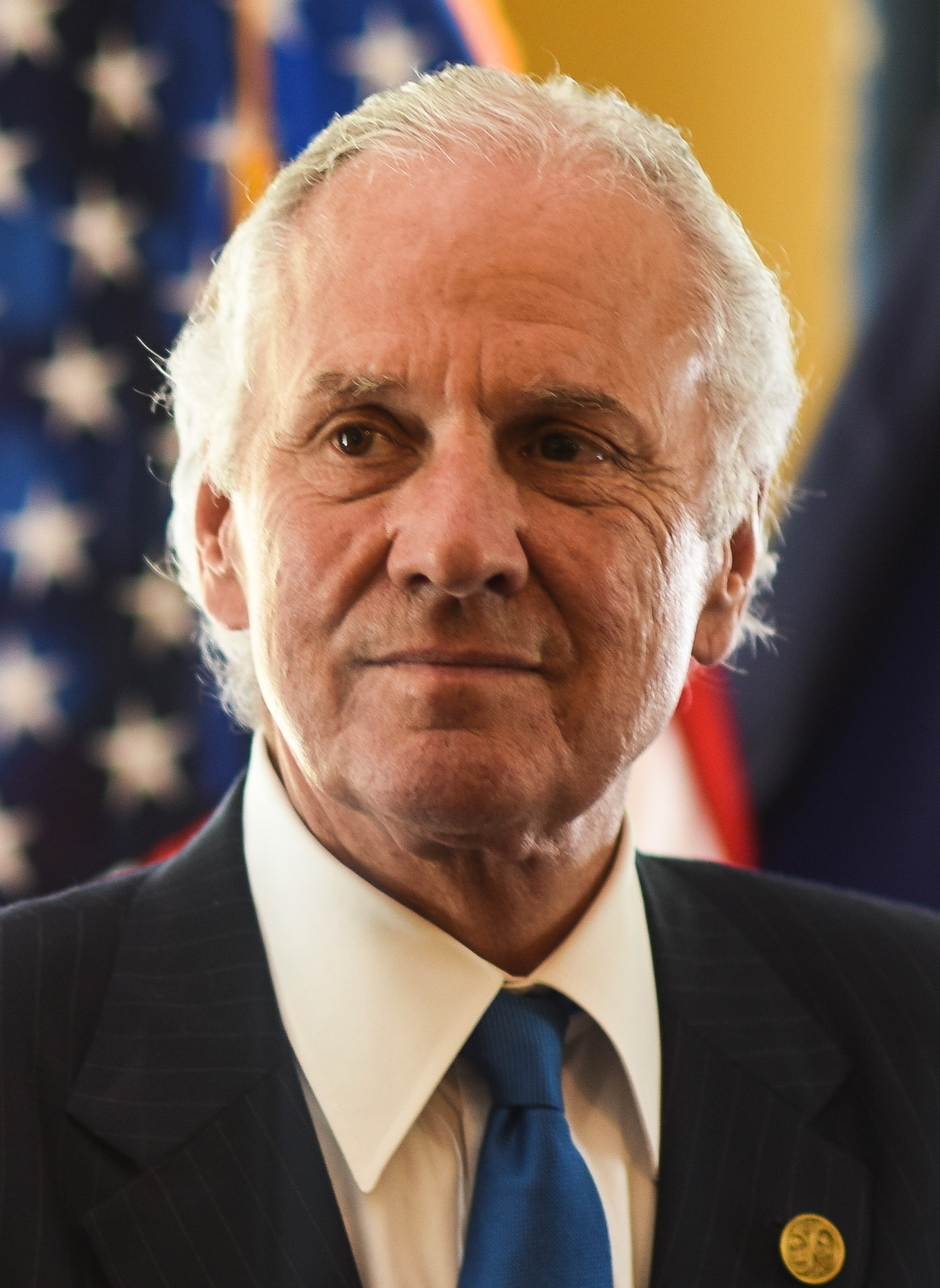

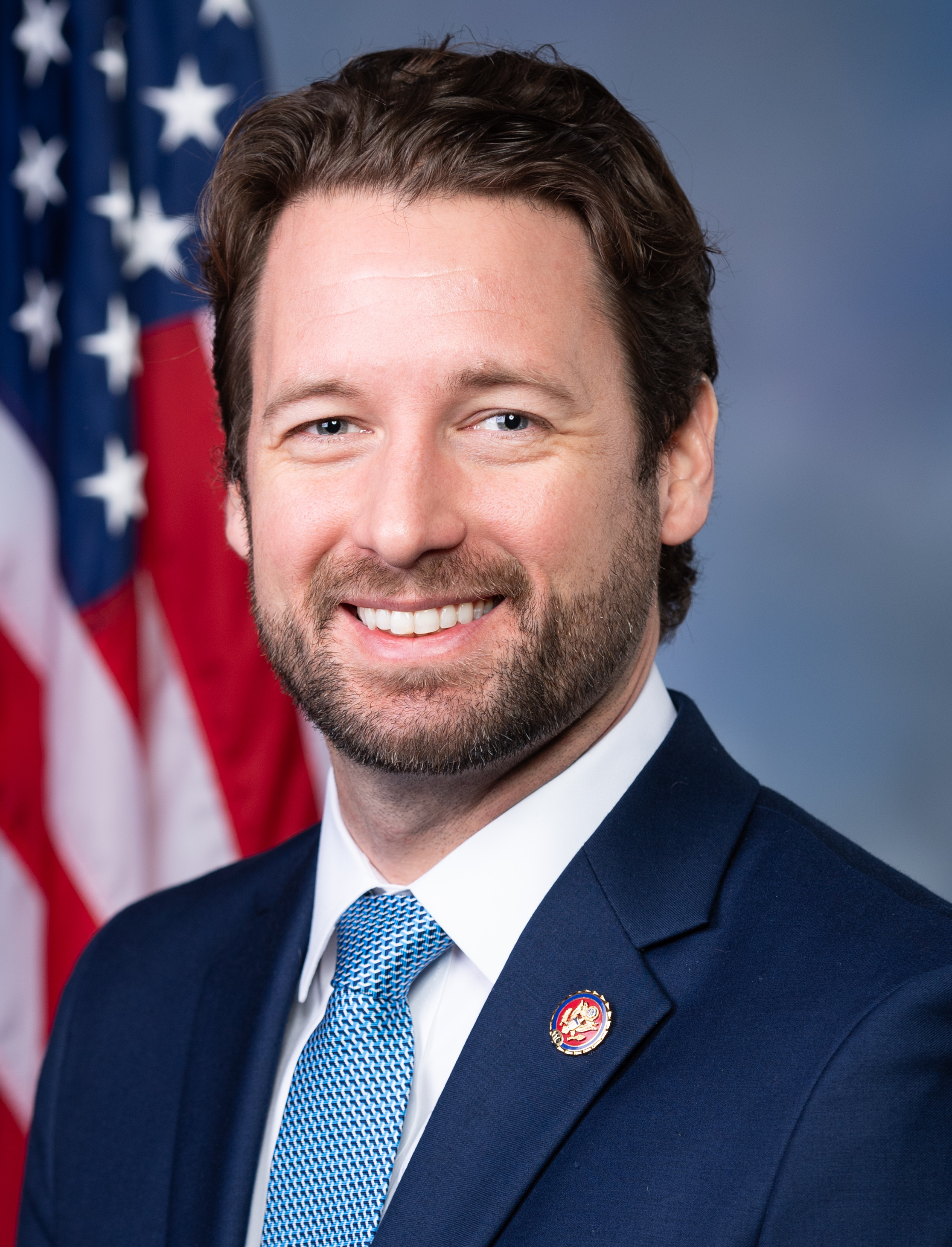
Nominee	Henry McMaster	Joe Cunningham
Party	Republican	Democratic
Running mate	Pamela Evette	Tally Parham Casey
Popular vote	988,501	692,691
Percentage	58.04%	40.67%
- County results McMaster: 50–60% 60–70% 70–80% Cunningham: 50–60% 60–70%
Governor before election
Henry McMaster
Republican
Elected Governor
Henry McMaster
Republican

Incumbent Republican governor Henry McMaster ran for re-election for a second full term in office and secured the Republican nomination in the June 14 primary. Joe Cunningham, former United States Representative from South Carolina's 1st congressional district, was the Democratic nominee.

McMaster won the general election with 58% of the vote — a subsequently larger majority than in 2018. McMaster took office on January 24, 2017, upon the resignation of Nikki Haley, and was elected to a full term in 2018.

South Carolina Gubernatorial Republican Primary Election, 2022
Party	Candidate	Votes	%
Republican	Henry McMaster (incumbent)	306,555	83.0%
Republican	Harrison Musselwhite	61,545	16.7%
Total votes		367,689	100%

South Carolina Gubernatiorial Democratic Primary Election, 2022
Party	Candidate	Votes	%
Democratic	Joe Cunningham	102,315	56.5%
Democratic	Mia McLeod	56,084	31.0%
Democratic	Carlton Boyd	9,526	5.3%
Democratic	William Williams	6,746	3.7%
Democratic	Calvin McMillan	6,260	3.5%
Total votes		180,931	100%

2022 South Carolina gubernatorial election
Party	Candidate	Votes	%	±%
Republican	Henry McMaster (incumbent); Pamela Evette (incumbent)	988,501	58.04%	+4.08%
Democratic	Joe Cunningham; Tally Parham Casey	692,691	40.67%	−5.25%
Libertarian	Morgan Bruce Reeves; Jessica Ethridge	20,826	1.22%	N/A
Write-in		1,174	0.07%	
Total votes		1,703,192	100%	N/A
Turnout		1,718,626	50.86%	
Registered electors		3,379,089		
Republican hold				

== South Dakota ==
South Dakota gubernatorial election
- Turnout: 59.40% ▼
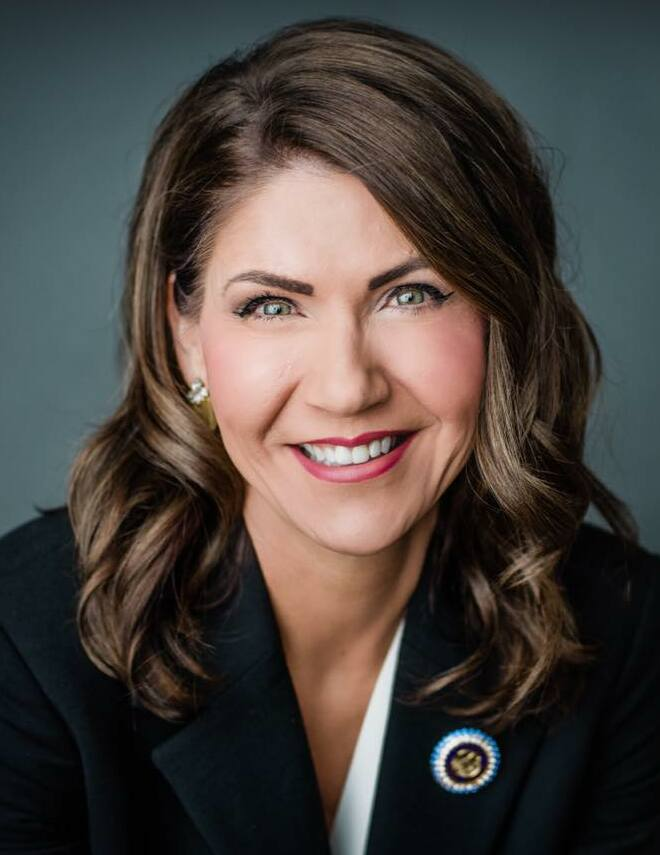

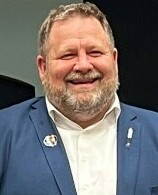
Nominee	Kristi Noem	Jamie Smith
Party	Republican	Democratic
Running mate	Larry Rhoden	Jennifer Healy Keintz
Popular vote	217,035	123,148
Percentage	61.98%	35.17%
- County results Noem: 50–60% 60–70% 70–80% 80–90% >90% Smith: 50–60% 70–80% 80–90%
Governor before election
Kristi Noem
Republican
Elected Governor
Kristi Noem
Republican

Governor Kristi Noem was elected in 2018 with 51% of the vote, and ran for re-election to a second term. The Democratic nominee is state representative Jamie Smith. Noem won a second term, winning 62% of the vote.

Republican primary results
Party	Candidate	Votes	%
Republican	Kristi Noem (incumbent)	91,661	76.4
Republican	Steven Haugaard	28,315	23.6
Total votes		119,976	100.0

2022 South Dakota gubernatorial election
Party	Candidate	Votes	%	±%
Republican	Kristi Noem (incumbent); Larry Rhoden (incumbent)	217,035	61.98%	+11.01%
Democratic	Jamie Smith; Jennifer Healy Keintz	123,148	35.17%	−12.43%
Libertarian	Tracey Quint; Ashley Strand	9,983	2.85%	+1.42%
Total votes		350,166	100.00%	N/A
Turnout			59.40%	
Registered electors		597,073		
Republican hold				

== Tennessee ==
Tennessee gubernatorial election
- November 8, 2022
- Turnout: 38.61% ▼15.85 pp
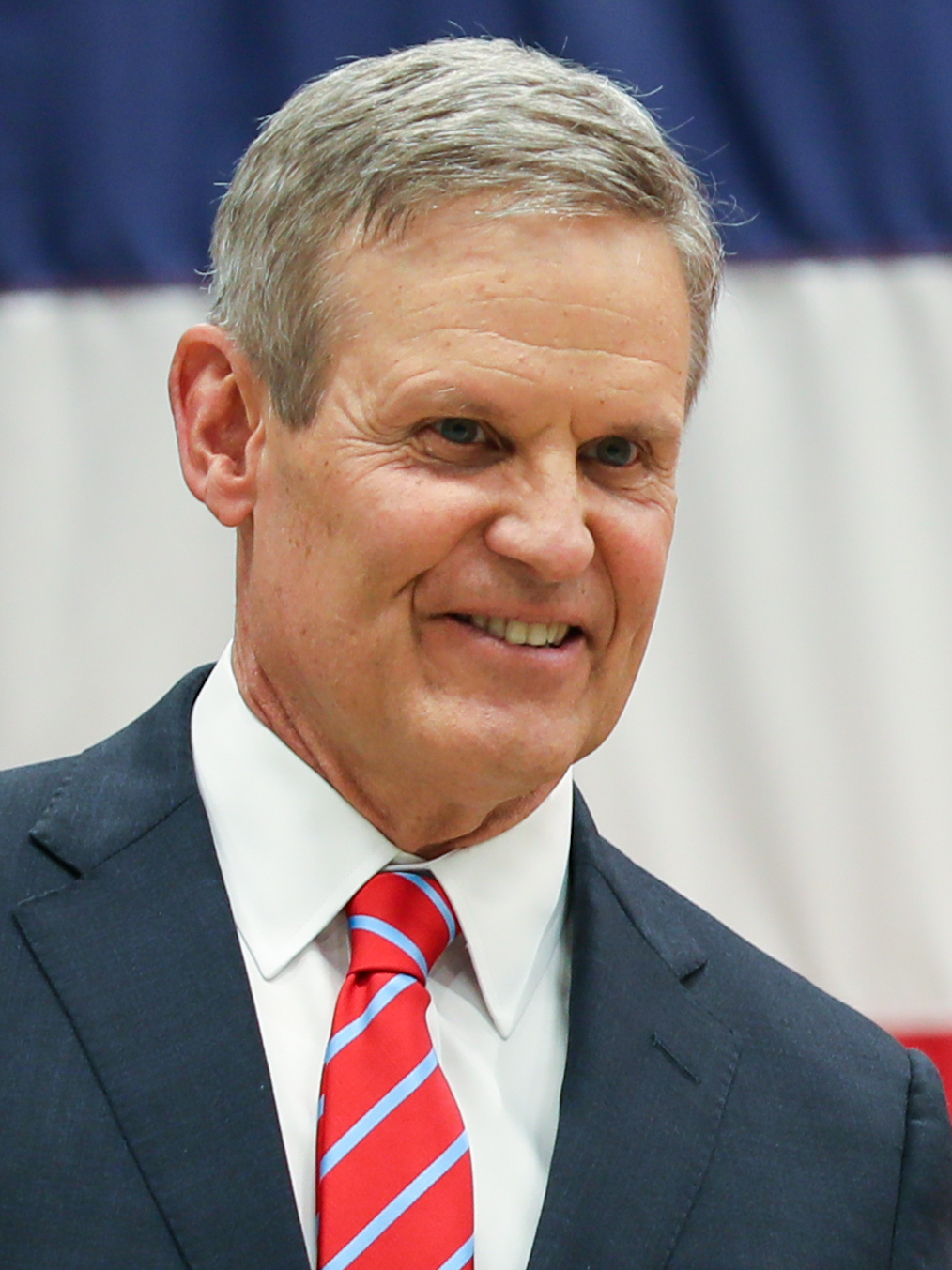

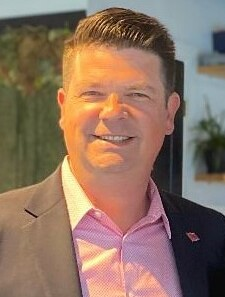
Nominee	Bill Lee	Jason Martin
Party	Republican	Democratic
Popular vote	1,129,390	572,818
Percentage	64.91%	32.92%
- Lee: 40–50% 50–60% 60–70% 70–80% 80–90% >90% Martin: 40–50% 50–60% 60–70% 70–80% 80–90% >90% No data
Governor before election
Bill Lee
Republican
Elected Governor
Bill Lee
Republican

Incumbent Republican governor Bill Lee won re-election to a second term with almost 65% of the vote, Improving on his performance from 2018. The Democratic challenger was Jason Martin.

Lee flipped reliably Democratic Haywood County, home to Brownsville. It is one of only two remaining counties in Tennessee, along with Shelby County, with a majority African-American population. Haywood County has not voted Republican on a presidential level since 1972.

Republican primary results
Party	Candidate	Votes	%
Republican	Bill Lee (incumbent)	494,362	100.00
Total votes		494,362	100.00

Democratic primary results
Party	Candidate	Votes	%
Democratic	Jason Martin	101,552	39.39
Democratic	J.B. Smiley Jr.	100,062	38.81
Democratic	Carnita Atwater	56,227	21.81
Total votes		257,841	100.00

2022 Tennessee gubernatorial election
Party	Candidate	Votes	%	±%
Republican	Bill Lee (incumbent)	1,129,390	64.91%	+5.55
Democratic	Jason Martin	572,818	32.92%	−5.63
Independent	John Gentry	15,395	0.89%	N/A
Independent	Constance Every	10,277	0.59%	N/A
Independent	Deborah Rouse	3,772	0.22%	N/A
Independent	Rick Tyler	2,380	0.14%	N/A
Independent	Charles Van Morgan	1,862	0.11%	N/A
Independent	Basil Marceaux	1,568	0.09%	N/A
Independent	Alfred O'Neil	1,216	0.07%	N/A
Independent	Michael Scantland	815	0.05%	N/A
Write-In	Lemichael D. Wilson	386	0.02%	N/A
Write-In	Charles Carney	2	0.00%	N/A
Write-In	Stephen C. Maxwell	1	0.00%	N/A
Write-In	Kameron Parker Scott	0	0.00%	N/A
Total votes		1,739,882	100.00%	
Turnout		1,756,397	38.61%	−15.85%
Registered electors		4,549,183		
Republican hold				

== Texas ==
Texas gubernatorial election
- Turnout: 45.85% ▼
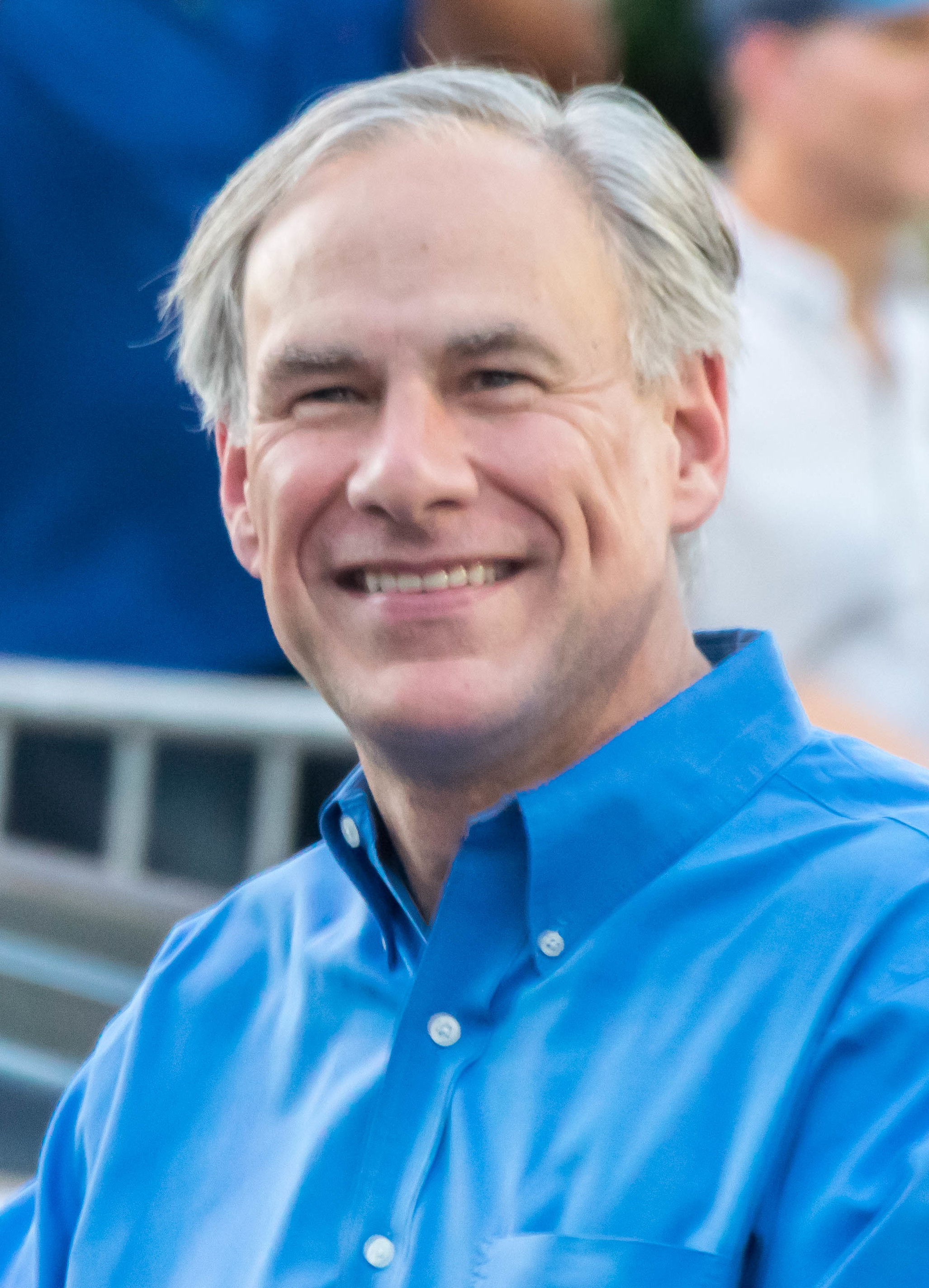

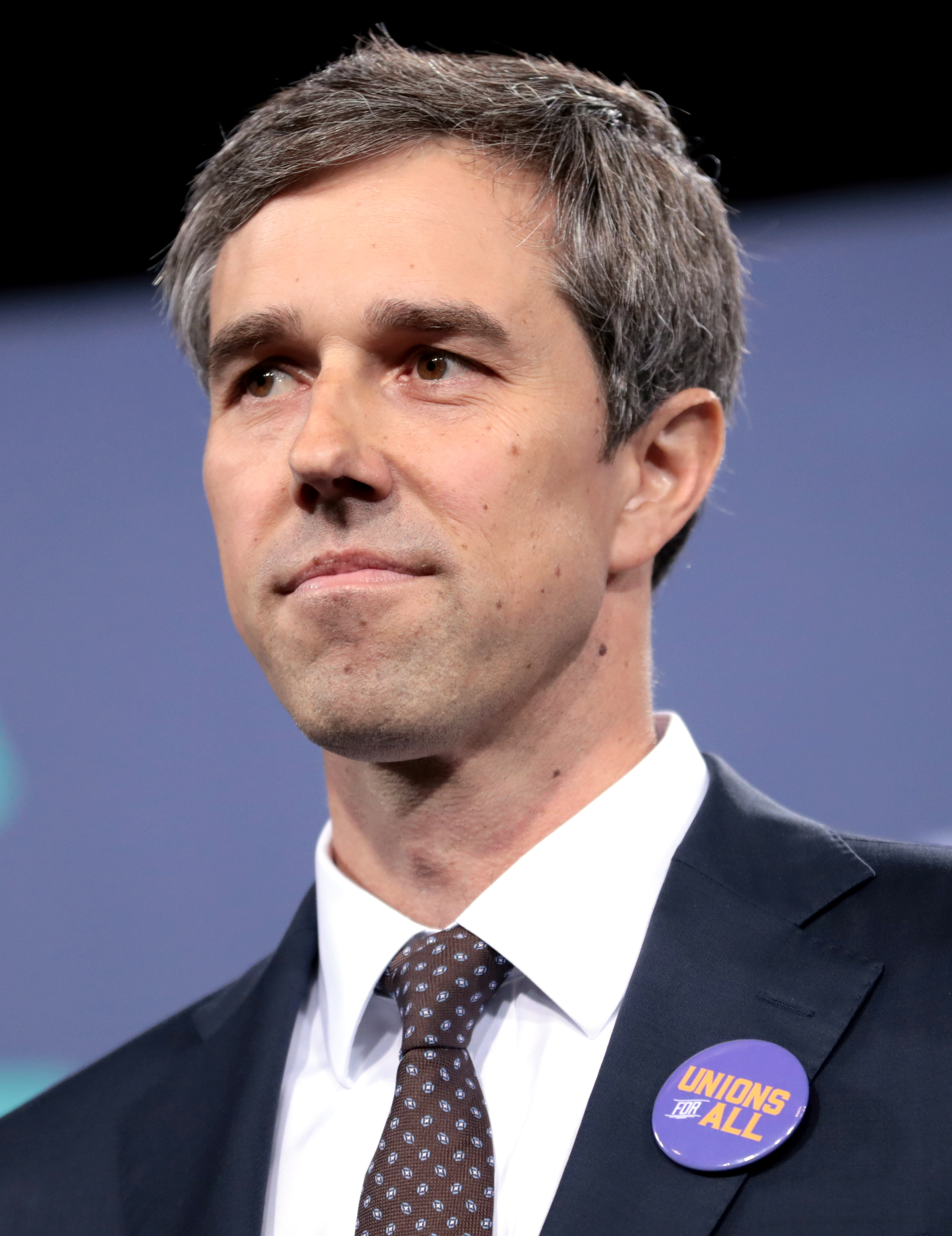
Nominee	Greg Abbott	Beto O'Rourke
Party	Republican	Democratic
Popular vote	4,437,099	3,553,656
Percentage	54.76%	43.86%
- Abbott: 40–50% 50–60% 60–70% 70–80% 80–90% >90% O'Rourke: 40–50% 50–60% 60–70% 70–80% 80–90% >90% Tie: 40–50% 50% No data
Governor before election
Greg Abbott
Republican
Elected Governor
Greg Abbott
Republican

Incumbent Republican governor Greg Abbott won re-election to a third term, defeating Democratic nominee and former Congressman, Beto O'Rourke. All statewide elected offices are currently held by Republicans. In his previous gubernatorial race in 2018, Abbott won with 55.8% of the vote.

The Democratic and Republican primaries were held on March 1, 2022. O'Rourke and Abbott won outright majorities in their respective primaries, and therefore did not participate in the May 24 runoffs.

Texas has not voted for a Democratic candidate for governor since Ann Richards in 1990. Additionally, Abbott had a strong approval rating on election day, with 55% of voters approving to 45% disapproving. Beto O'Rourke, who gained national attention in 2018 for his unusually close and competitive campaign against Senator Ted Cruz, was widely viewed as a rising star in the Texas Democratic Party and potential challenger for Abbott, but a failed run for President of the United States in 2020 prompted criticisms of opportunism, via Republican attempts to brand him as anti-law enforcement and his former comments on guns.

Abbott won re-election by 10.9%, which is a margin slightly smaller than his 13.3% in 2018 in spite of a much redder national climate in 2022, making this the closest gubernatorial election in Texas since 2006, and the closest election of Abbott's entire political career since his first race for the Texas Supreme Court in 1998. Beto O'Rourke, meanwhile, performed 8.3% worse than his 2018 Senate run, but did still win the highest share for a Democratic gubernatorial candidate since Ann Richards received 45.88% in her unsuccessful reelection bid against George W. Bush in 1994. Abbott's raw vote total was less than his 4.65 million in 2018, while O'Rourke set a record of most raw votes for a Texas Democratic gubernatorial candidate at around 3.55 million, but was also less than his 4.04 million vote total in the 2018 Senate race.

Abbott carried 235 out of 254 counties in his re-election victory, flipping the heavily Hispanic counties of Culberson and Zapata and becoming the first Republican gubernatorial candidate to win the latter in the state's history (though Zapata had voted Republican in the 2020 presidential election), while O'Rourke became the first Democratic gubernatorial candidate to win the county of Fort Bend since 1974. O'Rourke outperformed Joe Biden two years prior among Latino voters though his performance with them was still worse than past nominees.

Republican primary results
Party	Candidate	Votes	%
Republican	Greg Abbott (incumbent)	1,299,059	66.48%
Republican	Allen West	239,557	12.26%
Republican	Don Huffines	234,138	11.98%
Republican	Chad Prather	74,173	3.80%
Republican	Ricky Lynn Perry	61,424	3.14%
Republican	Kandy Kaye Horn	23,605	1.21%
Republican	Paul Belew	11,387	0.58%
Republican	Danny Harrison	10,829	0.55%
Total votes		1,954,172	100%

Democratic primary results
Party	Candidate	Votes	%
Democratic	Beto O'Rourke	983,182	91.41%
Democratic	Joy Diaz	33,622	3.13%
Democratic	Michael Cooper	32,673	3.04%
Democratic	Rich Wakeland	13,237	1.23%
Democratic	Inocencio Barrientez	12,887	1.20%
Total votes		1,075,601	100%

2022 Texas gubernatorial election
Party	Candidate	Votes	%	±%
Republican	Greg Abbott (incumbent)	4,437,099	54.76%	−1.05%
Democratic	Beto O'Rourke	3,553,656	43.86%	+1.35%
Libertarian	Mark Tippetts	81,932	1.01%	−0.68%
Green	Delilah Barrios	28,584	0.35%	N/A
Total votes		8,102,908	100.00%	N/A
Turnout		8,102,908	45.85%	
Registered electors		17,672,143		
Republican hold				

== Vermont ==
2022 Vermont gubernatorial election
- November 8, 2022
- Turnout: 57.6% ▼
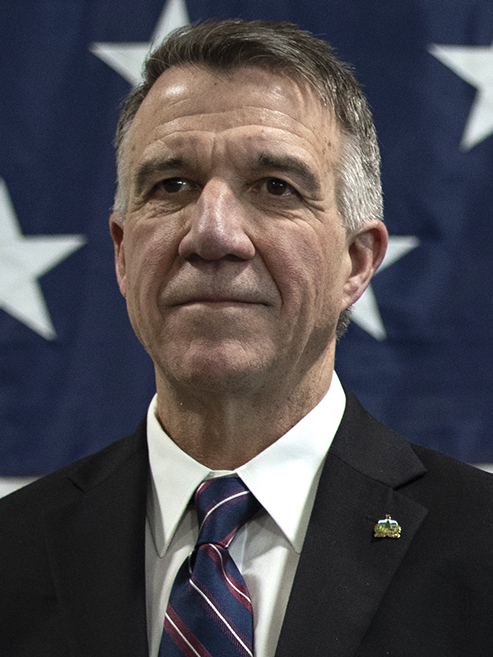

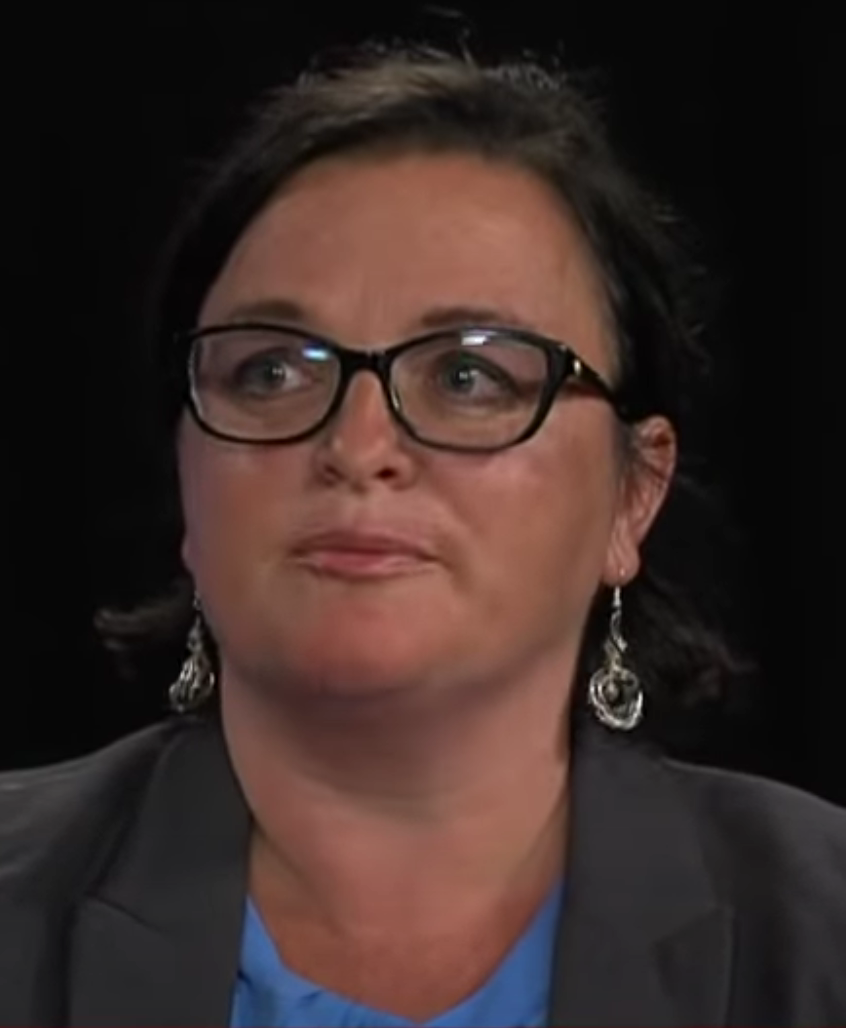
Nominee	Phil Scott	Brenda Siegel
Party	Republican	Democratic
Alliance		Progressive
Popular vote	202,147	68,248
Percentage	70.9%	23.9%
- Scott: 50–60% 60–70% 70–80% 80–90%
Governor before election
Phil Scott
Republican
Elected Governor
Phil Scott
Republican

Incumbent Republican governor Phil Scott was re-elected in 2020 with 68.5% of the vote and ran for re-election to a fourth term.

In the general election, Scott easily defeated Democrat Brenda Siegel for his fourth consecutive term.

This race was one of six Republican-held governorships up for election in 2022 in a state carried by Joe Biden in the 2020 presidential election. Scott's victory, in which he carried every municipality in the state, is the largest by margin in a Vermont gubernatorial race since Howard Dean's landslide in 1996. Scott's 47-point victory margin was the largest for a Republican candidate since 1950, even while Democratic congressman Peter Welch won the concurrent U.S. Senate election by a 40-point margin.

Republican primary results
Party	Candidate	Votes	%
Republican	Phil Scott (incumbent)	20,319	68.56%
Republican	Stephen C. Bellows	5,402	18.22%
Republican	Peter Duval	3,627	12.24%
Write-in		290	0.98%
Total votes		29,638	100.0%

Democratic primary results
Party	Candidate	Votes	%
Democratic	Brenda Siegel	56,287	85.92%
Write-in		9,227	14.08%
Total votes		65,514	100.0%

2022 Vermont gubernatorial election
Party	Candidate	Votes	%	±%
Republican	Phil Scott (incumbent)	202,147	70.91%	+0.75
Democratic/Progressive	Brenda Siegel (Note: Candidate received the nominations of both the Democratic and Progressive parties and will be listed on the ballot as "Democratic/Progressive" (candidate is primarily a Democrat).)	68,248	23.94%	
Independent	Kevin Hoyt	6,022	2.06%	+0.80
Independent	Peter Duval	4,723	1.62%	N/A
Independent	Bernard Peters	2,315	0.79%	N/A
Write-in		1,346	0.46%	+0.02
Total votes		284,801	100%	
Rejected ballots		255		
Blank ballots		6,899		
Turnout		291,955	57.62%	
Registered electors		506,666		
Republican hold				

== Wisconsin ==
Wisconsin gubernatorial election
- Turnout: 56.7% ▼
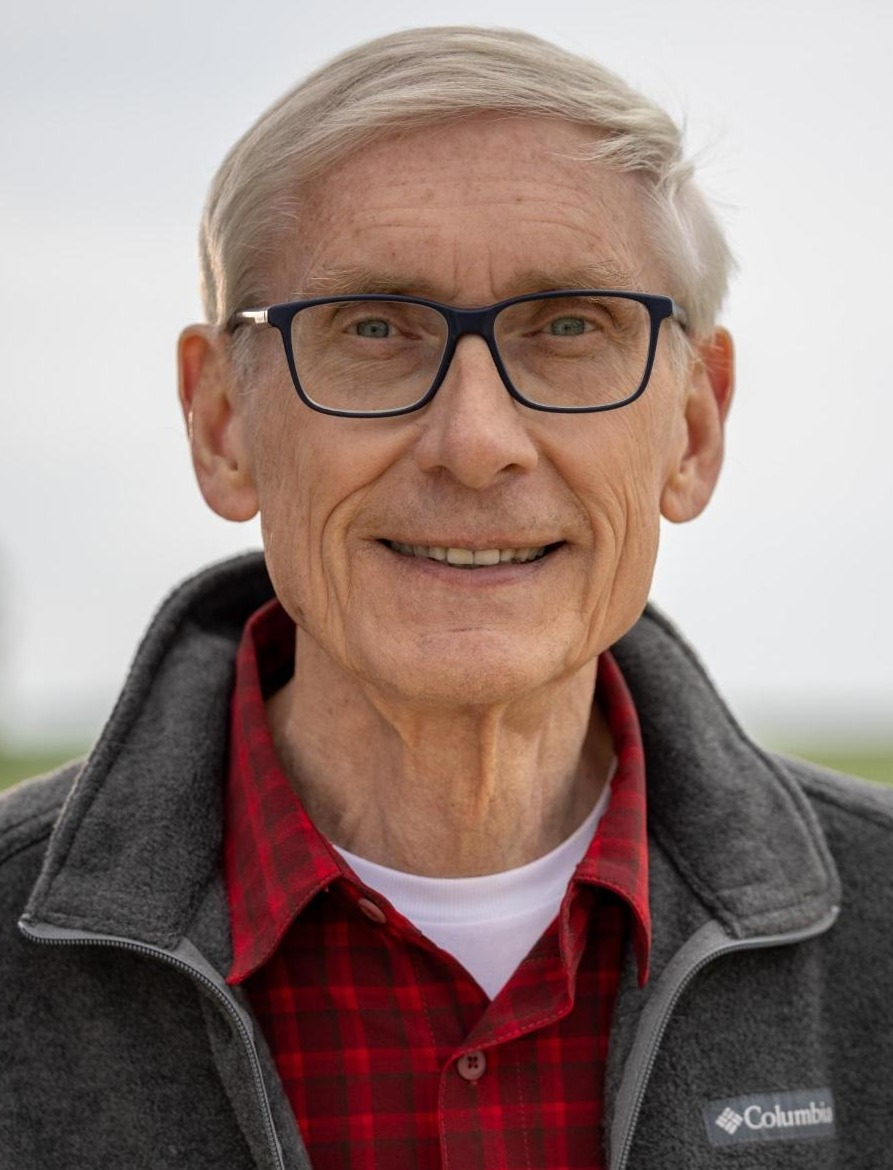

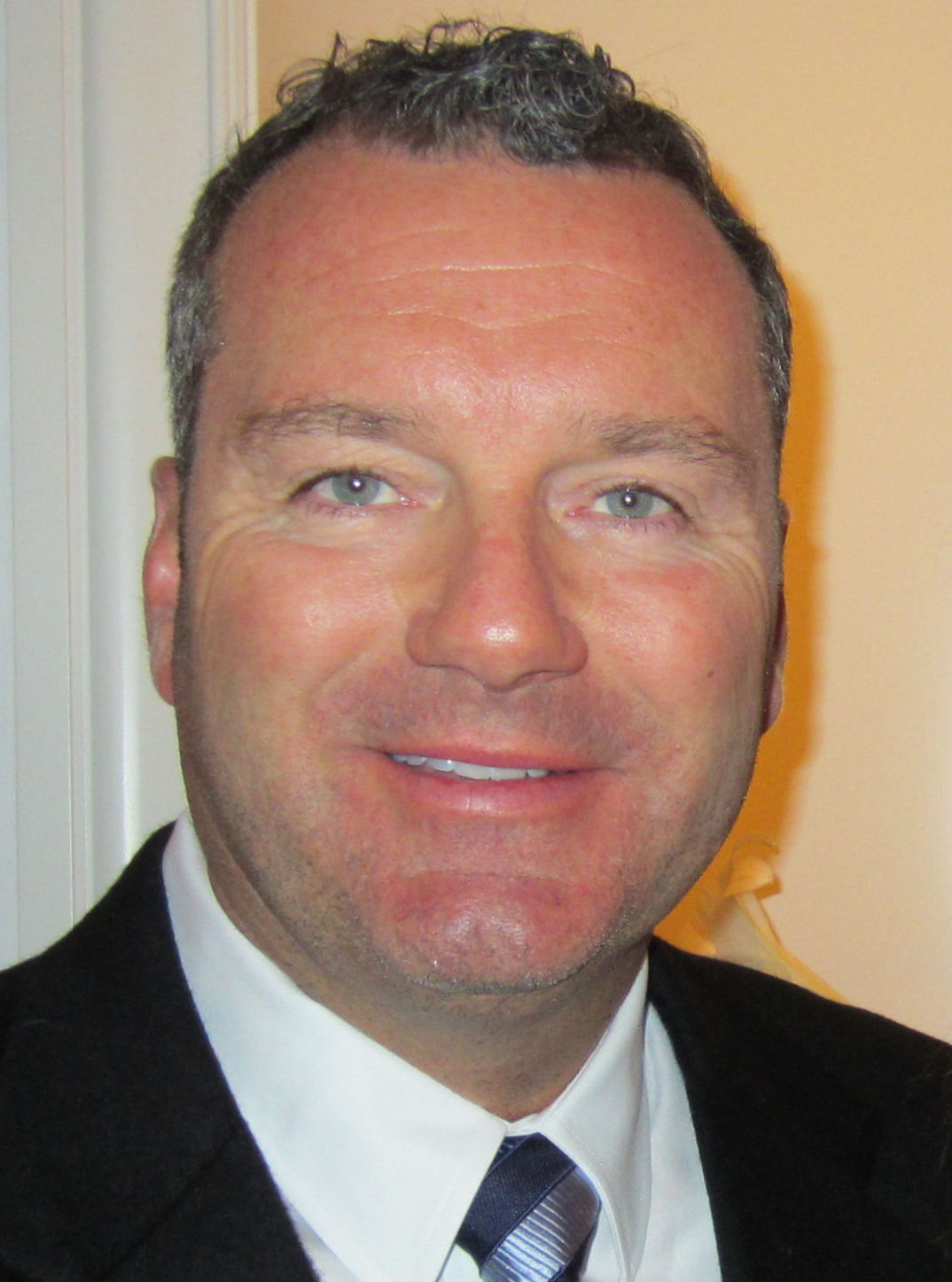
Nominee	Tony Evers	Tim Michels
Party	Democratic	Republican
Running mate	Sara Rodriguez	Roger Roth
Popular vote	1,358,774	1,268,535
Percentage	51.2%	47.8%
- Evers: 40–50% 50–60% 60–70% 70–80% 80–90% >90% Michels: 40–50% 50–60% 60–70% 70–80% 80–90% >90% Tie: 40–50% 50% No data
Governor before election
Tony Evers
Democratic
Elected Governor
Tony Evers
Democratic

Incumbent Democratic governor Tony Evers won re-election to a second term, defeating Republican nominee, Tim Michels.

As Lieutenant Governor Mandela Barnes ran for the U.S. Senate in the concurrent election, a new Democratic running mate, state assemblywoman Sara Rodriguez, was nominated in the partisan primary. Barnes was the second lieutenant governor not to run with the incumbent governor since the state constitution was amended in 1967. The partisan primary was held on August 9, 2022, with businessman Tim Michels defeating former lieutenant governor Rebecca Kleefisch in the Republican primary. State senator Roger Roth received the Republican nomination for lieutenant governor.

This was the first gubernatorial election in Wisconsin since 2006 in which a Democrat won with an outright majority of the vote, the first since 1990 in which the winner was from the same party as the incumbent president, and the first since 1962 in which Wisconsin voted for a Democratic governor at the same time the party held the presidency. This was also the first gubernatorial election in the state since 1998 in which the winning candidate was of a different party than the winner of the concurrent U.S. Senate election.

Democratic primary results
Party	Candidate	Votes	%
Democratic	Tony Evers (incumbent)	491,656	100.0%
Total votes		491,656	100.0%

Republican primary results
Party	Candidate	Votes	%
Republican	Tim Michels	326,969	47.18%
Republican	Rebecca Kleefisch	291,384	42.05%
Republican	Timothy Ramthun	41,639	6.01%
Republican	Kevin Nicholson (withdrawn)	24,884	3.59%
Republican	Adam Fischer	8,139	1.17%
Total votes		693,015	100.0%

Wisconsin gubernatorial election, 2022
Party	Candidate	Votes	%	±%
Democratic	Tony Evers (incumbent); Sara Rodriguez	1,358,774	51.15%	+1.61%
Republican	Tim Michels; Roger Roth	1,268,535	47.75%	−0.69%
Independent	Joan Ellis Beglinger (withdrawn); N/A	27,198	1.02%	N/A
Write-in		1,983	0.08%	+0.04%
Total votes		2,656,490	100.0%	-0.63%
Turnout		2,668,891	70.96%	
Registered electors		3,760,845		
Democratic hold				

== Wyoming ==
Wyoming gubernatorial election
- Turnout: 66.6% ▼
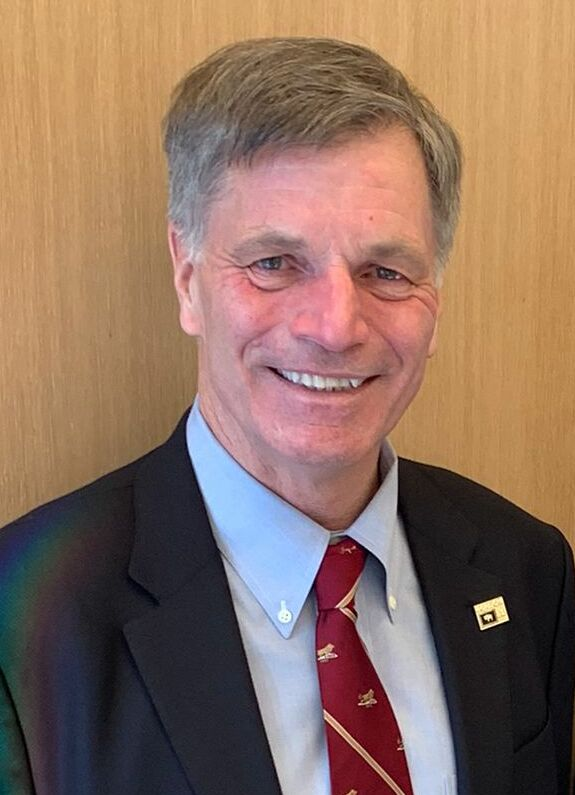

Nominee	Mark Gordon	Theresa Livingston
Party	Republican	Democratic
Popular vote	143,696	30,686
Percentage	74.1%	15.8%
- County results Gordon: 40–50% 50–60% 60–70% 70–80% 80–90%
Governor before election
Mark Gordon
Republican
Elected Governor
Mark Gordon
Republican

Governor Mark Gordon was elected in 2018 with 67.1% of the vote and ran for re-election to a second term. Perennial candidate Rex Rammell and truck driver Aaron Nab were primary challenging Gordon.

Gordon and Livingston won their primaries on August 16, 2022. Livingston's 16.3% of the vote was the worst performance that year in a gubernatorial or senate race, doing worse than Leslie Petersen's 22.9% in 2010 and Brenda Siegel's 26.2% in Vermont 2022, and the worst performance by a Democrat in gubernatorial race in Wyoming history.

Republican primary results
Party	Candidate	Votes	%
Republican	Mark Gordon (incumbent)	101,092	61.7
Republican	Brent Bien	48,549	29.7
Republican	Rex Rammell	9,373	5.7
Republican	James Scott Quick	4,725	2.9
Total votes		163,739	100.0

Democratic primary results
Party	Candidate	Votes	%
Democratic	Theresa Livingston	4,989	71.2
Democratic	Rex Wilde	2,016	28.8
Total votes		7,005	100.0

2022 Wyoming gubernatorial election
Party	Candidate	Votes	%	±%
Republican	Mark Gordon (incumbent)	143,696	74.07%	+6.95%
Democratic	Theresa Livingston	30,686	15.82%	−11.72%
Write-in		11,461	5.91%	+5.37%
Libertarian	Jared Baldes	8,157	4.20%	+2.72%
Total votes		194,000	100.0%	
Turnout		198,198	66.59%	
Registered electors		297,639		
Republican hold				

== Territories and federal district ==
=== District of Columbia ===
2022 Washington, D.C., mayoral election
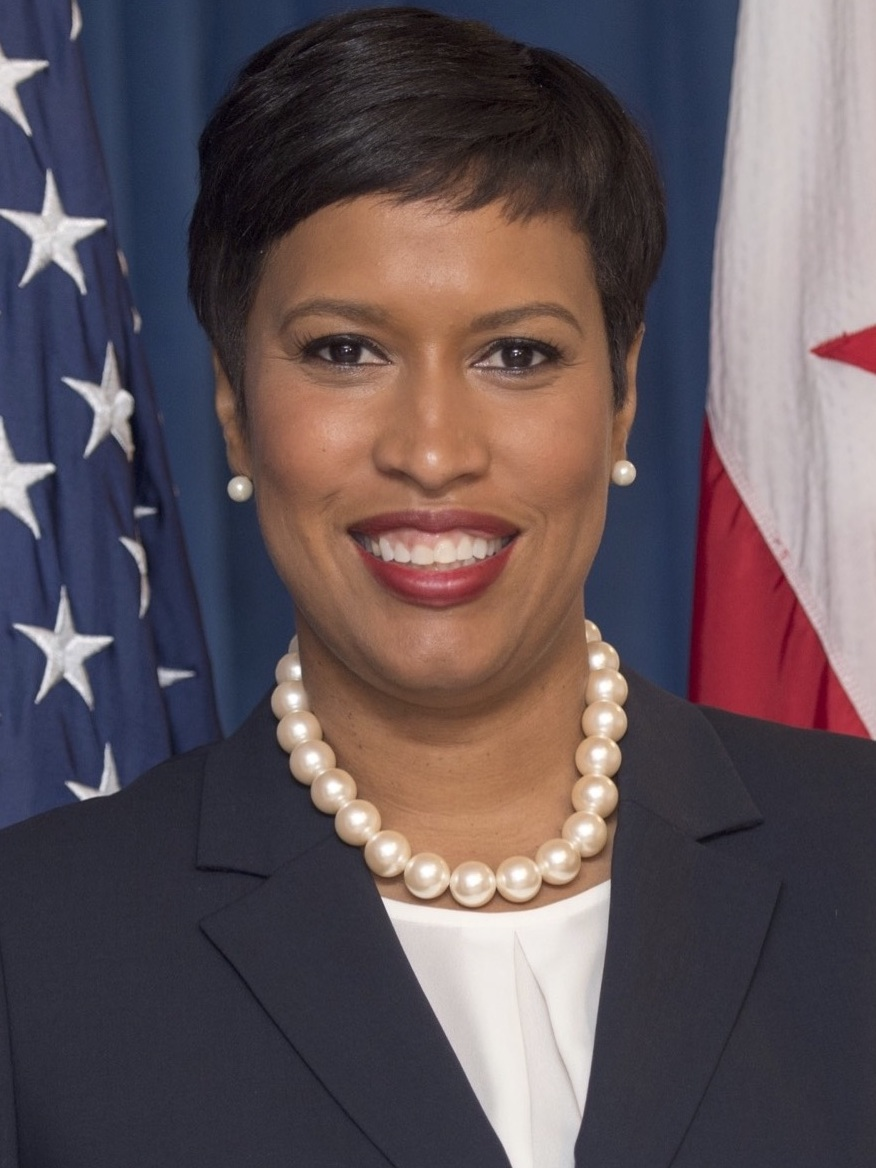

Nominee	Muriel Bowser	Rodney "Red" Grant	Stacia Hall
Party	Democratic	Independent	Republican
Popular vote	147,433	29,531	11,510
Percentage	74.62%	14.95%	5.83%
- Results by ward Bowser: 60–70% 70–80%
Mayor before election
Muriel Bowser
Democratic
Elected Mayor
Muriel Bowser
Democratic

Mayor Muriel Bowser was re-elected in 2018 with 76.4% of the vote and ran for a third term. She was renominated, defeating city councilors Robert White and Trayon White in the primary. She defeated Republican nominee Stacia Hall and independent Rodney "Red" Grant. D.C. Statehood Green nominee Corren Brown did not appear in the general election ballot.

2022 Washington, D.C., mayoral election
Party	Candidate	Votes	%	±%
Democratic	Muriel Bowser (incumbent)	147,433	74.62	−1.78
Independent	Rodney Grant	29,531	14.95	N/A
Republican	Stacia Hall	11,510	5.83	N/A
Libertarian	Dennis Sobin	2,521	1.28	−2.12
Write-in		6,580	3.33	-0.67
Total votes		183785	100	
Turnout		205,774	40.76	−5.53
Registered electors		504,815		

=== Guam ===
2022 Guamanian gubernatorial election
- November 8, 2022
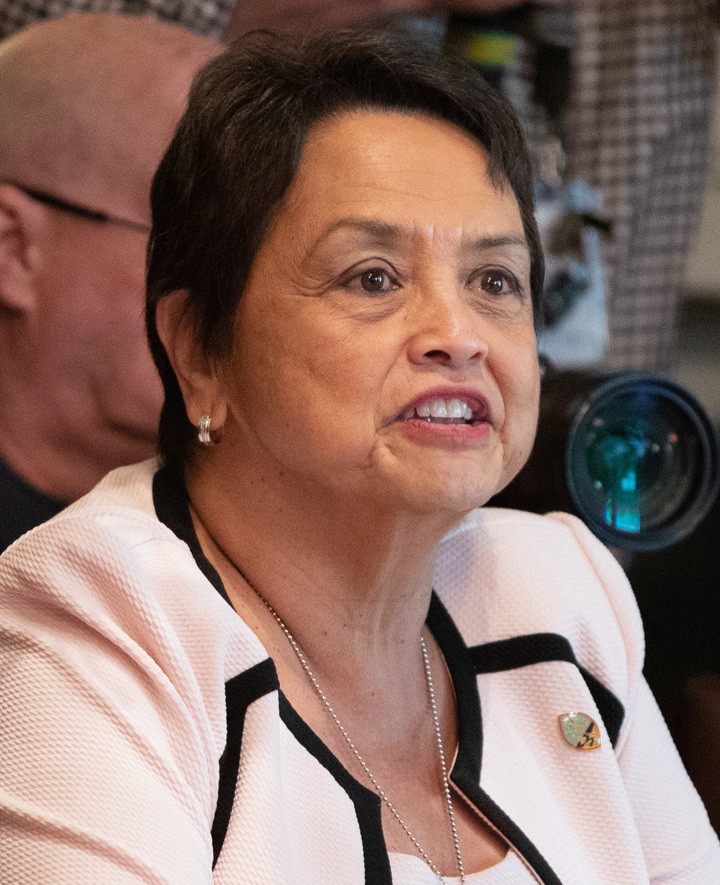

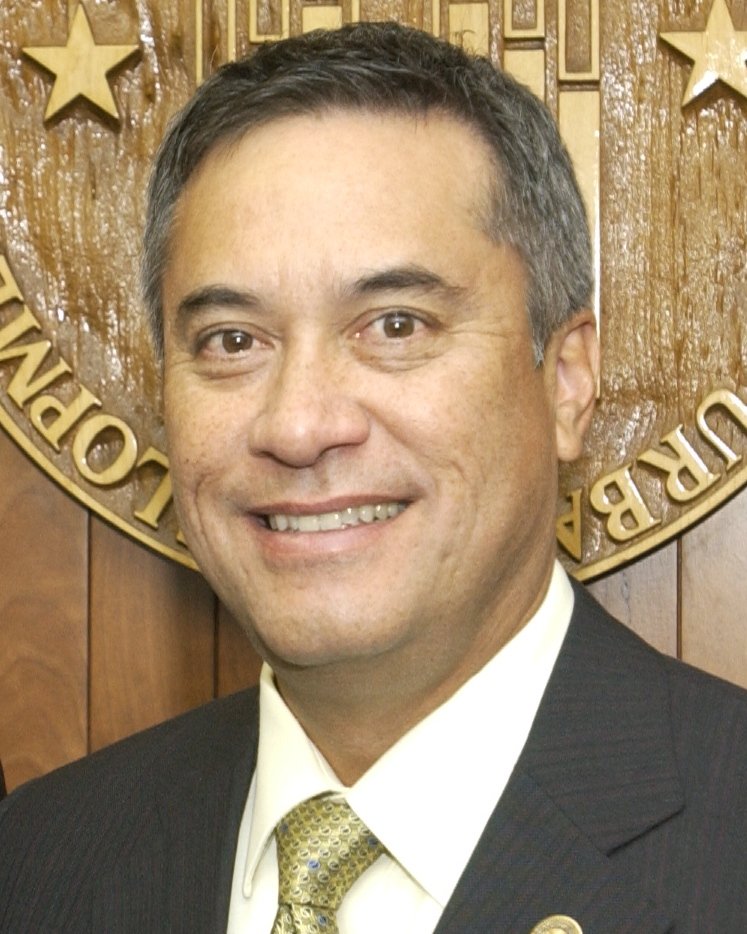
Nominee	Lou Leon Guerrero	Felix Camacho
Party	Democratic	Republican
Running mate	Josh Tenorio	Tony Ada
Popular vote	18,623	14,786
Percentage	55.5%	44.1%
- Results by village Guerrero: 50–60% 60–70% Camacho: 50–60%
Governor before election
Lou Leon Guerrero
Democratic
Elected Governor
Lou Leon Guerrero
Democratic

Governor Lou Leon Guerrero was elected in 2018 with 50.8% of the vote and ran for re-election to a second term. She was being challenged in the Democratic primary by U.S. House delegate Michael San Nicolas.

The only Republican candidate is former governor Felix Camacho.

Guerrero and Camacho won their respective primaries on August 27.

On November 8, Guerrero won re-election, winning by an 11-point margin (a 13-point shift right since 2018).

2022 Guam gubernatorial election
Party	Candidate	Votes	%	±%
Democratic	Lou Leon Guerrero (incumbent); Josh Tenorio (incumbent)	18,623	55.49%	+4.7%
Republican	Felix Camacho; Tony Ada	14,786	44.06%	+17.67%
Write-in		152	0.45%	−22.37%
Total votes		33,561	100.0%	
Turnout		34,074	56.36%	
Registered electors		60,462		
Democratic hold				

=== Northern Mariana Islands ===
Northern Mariana Islands gubernatorial election
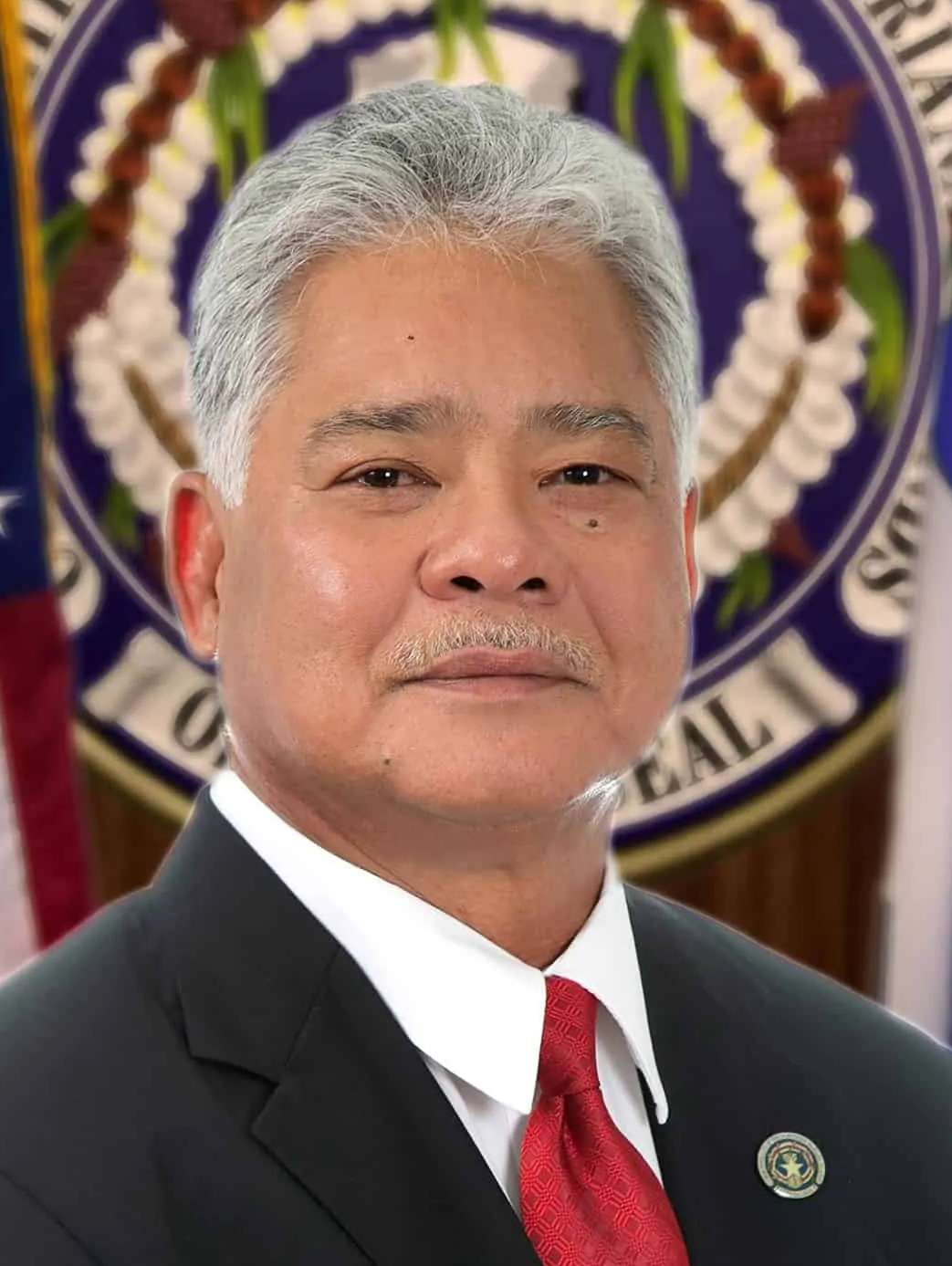

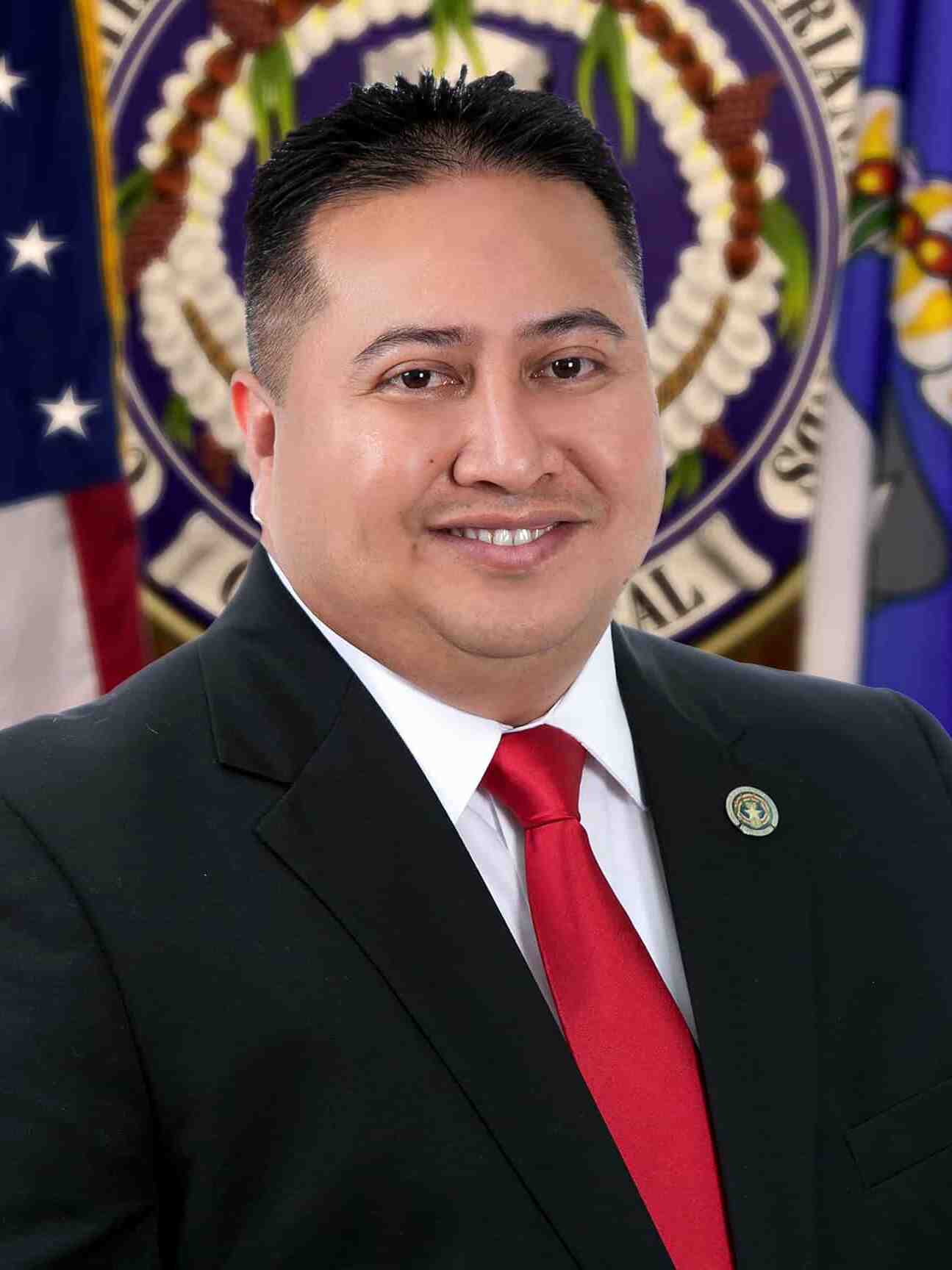

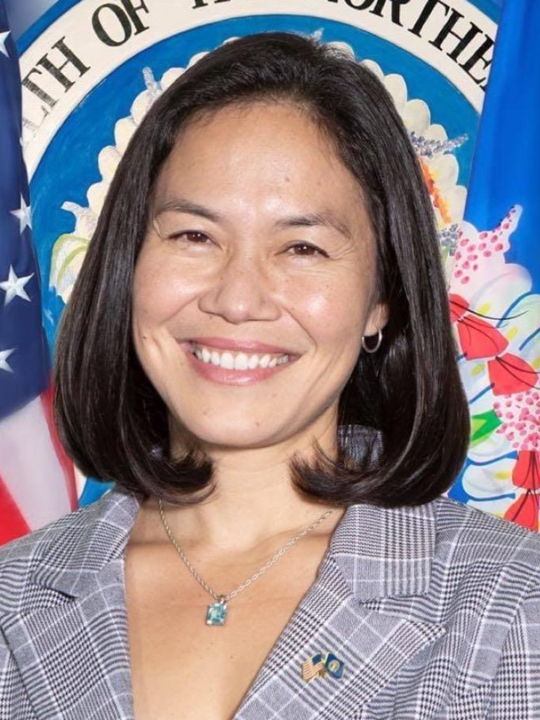
Nominee	Arnold Palacios	Ralph Torres	Tina Sablan
Party	Independent	Republican	Democratic
Running mate	David Apatang	Vinnie Sablan	Leila Staffler
First round	4,890; 32.2%	5,726; 38.8%	4,132; 28.0%
Runoff	7,077; 54.0%	6,017; 46.0%	Eliminated
- Results by voting district: Arnold Palacios: 50–55% 60–65% 65–70% Ralph Torres: 50–55% 65–70% 70–75%
Governor before election
Ralph Torres
Republican
Elected Governor
Arnold Palacios
Independent

Governor Ralph Torres became governor on December 29, 2015, upon the death of incumbent governor Eloy Inos. He was elected to his first full term in 2018 with 62.2% of the vote. Torres was challenged by his lieutenant governor, Arnold Palacios, a career Republican who ran as an independent, and by Democratic representative Tina Sablan. Torres earned 38.8% of the votes in the general election, ahead of Palacios and Sablan, but since no candidate won a clear majority a runoff between Torres and Palacios was held on November 25. Palacios, who gained the backing of Sablan, won the runoff handily, earning 54.05% of the vote.

2022 Northern Mariana Islands Gubernatorial Election
Party	Candidate	Votes	%
Republican	Ralph Torres (incumbent) Vinnie Sablan	5,726	38.83%
Independent	Arnold Palacios David Apatang	4,890	33.15%
Democratic	Tina Sablan Leila Staffler	4,132	28.01%
Total votes		14,750	100.0
Turnout			%
Registered electors			

2022 Northern Mariana Islands Gubernatorial Runoff Election.
Party	Candidate	Votes	%
Independent	Arnold Palacios David Apatang	7,077	54.95%
Republican	Ralph Torres (incumbent) Vinnie Sablan	6,017	45.95%
Total votes		13,094	100.0
Turnout			%
Registered electors			
Independent gain from Republican			

=== U.S. Virgin Islands ===
United States Virgin Islands gubernatorial election
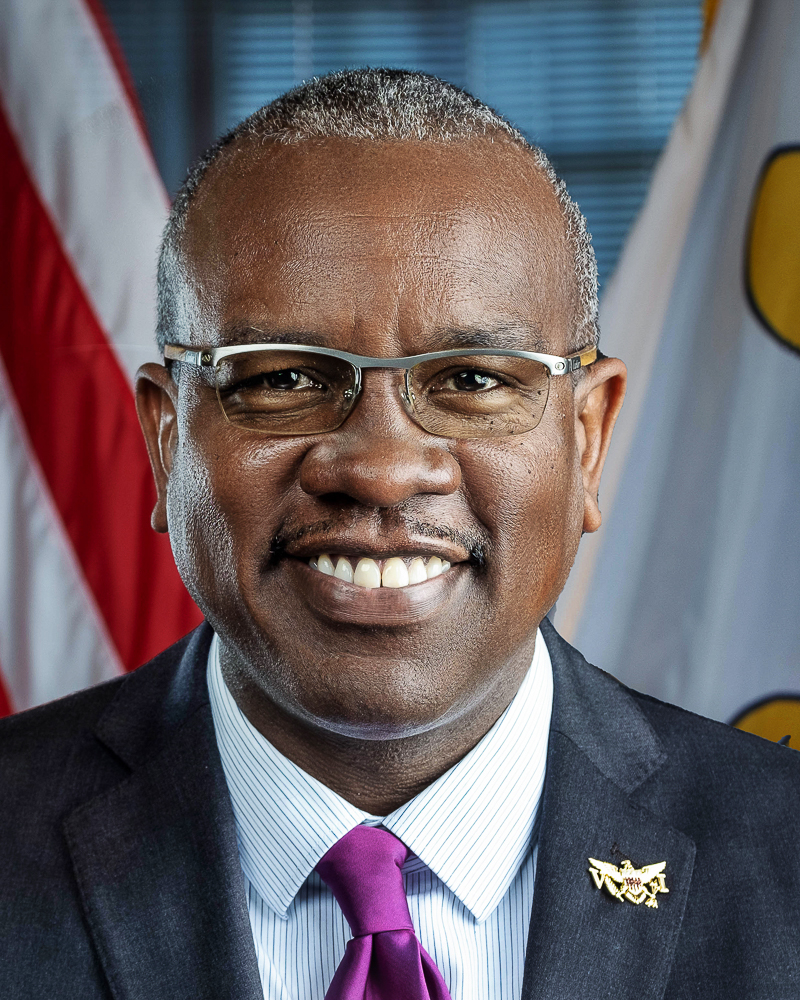
Nominee	Albert Bryan	Kurt Vialet
Party	Democratic	Independent
Running mate	Tregenza Roach	Janelle Sarauw
Popular vote	12,157	8,244
Percentage	56.1%	38.1%
- Results by district
Governor before election
Albert Bryan
Democratic
Elected Governor
Albert Bryan
Democratic

Governor Albert Bryan was elected in 2018 with 54.5% of the vote and ran for re-election to a second term. St. Croix Democratic senator Kurt Vialet is running as an independent.

2022 U.S. Virgin Islands gubernatorial election
Party	Candidate	Votes	%
Democratic	Albert Bryan Jr. (incumbent)	12,157	56.14
Independent	Kurt Vialet	8,244	38.07
Independent Citizens Movement	Stephen Frett	740	3.42
Independent	Ronald Pickard	243	1.12
N/A	Write-In	272	1.26
Total votes		21,656	100.00
Turnout		22,557	56.52
Registered electors		39,910	
Democratic hold			

== See also ==
- 2022 United States elections
- 2022 United States House of Representatives elections
- 2022 United States Senate elections
