= Chris Jones (Arkansas politician) =

American politician (born 1976)

- Jones in 2022

Personal details
- Born: Christopher Michael Jones; October 13, 1976 (age 50) Pine Bluff, Arkansas, U.S.
- Party: Democratic
- Spouse: Jerrilyn Jones (m. 2002)
- Education: Morehouse College (BS); Massachusetts Institute of Technology (MS, PhD)
- Website: Campaign website

Christopher Michael Jones (born October 13, 1976) is an American politician, nuclear engineer, academic administrator, and minister. He was the Democratic Party nominee for governor of Arkansas in the 2022 election. Born in Pine Bluff, Arkansas, he attended Morehouse College and graduate school at the Massachusetts Institute of Technology. He's currently the Director of Community and Social Innovation with BCT Partners. He previously worked at the Arkansas Regional Innovation Hub, from which he resigned in April 2021. On June 15, 2021, Jones announced that he was entering the Democratic primary for governor of Arkansas. He won the primary but lost the general election to Sarah Huckabee Sanders. On August 1, 2025, Jones filed to run for the Democratic nomination in Arkansas's 2nd congressional district.

== Early life ==
Christopher Michael Jones was born in Pine Bluff, Arkansas on October 13, 1976, where he "rode dirt bikes and fought grasshoppers". He is a 7th generation Arkansan, and his family arrived in Arkansas before it was designated a territory in 1819. Both of his parents are preachers, his father is also an insurance sales representative and his mother is also a retired teacher.

Jones was inspired by the Challenger space launch to become an astronaut. However, he was ineligible because he cannot hear out of his left ear. Jones met Bill Clinton when Clinton was governor of Arkansas, which interested Jones in politics.

Jones attended Watson Chapel High School in Pine Bluff, Arkansas, and graduated in 1995 at the top of his class. Jones also ran track (400 m), played football (quarterback), sang in choir, and participated in theater.

== Education ==
Jones attended Morehouse College on a NASA scholarship, which Jones credits as the only way he could have attended the college since his parents could not afford it. He graduated with a Bachelors of Science in Mathematics and a Bachelors of Science in Physics. He interned at NASA each summer. Jones was the student body president at Morehouse College.

Jones attended the Massachusetts Institute of Technology (MIT) as a graduate student in Nuclear Engineering. He graduated in 2003 with a Masters of Science in Nuclear Engineering and a Masters of Science in Technology and Policy. His thesis was titled, "Nonproliferation issues in the nuclear energy future." Later, Jones enrolled in a doctoral program in the Department of Urban Studies and Planning, and graduated in 2016 with a Doctor of Philosophy in Urban Planning. As a student, Jones was the co-chair of the Black Graduate Student Association. His dissertation researched the social, political, and economic impacts of development using the Tennessee Valley Authority as a test case; it was called Power for the public good: energy, race and class in the United States.

Jones's choices of Morehouse College and MIT were inspired respectively by Martin Luther King Jr. and Ronald McNair.

== Career ==
Jones taught algebra for one year at a Boston public school. His research included an 18-month study on the future of nuclear power, plasma fusion, nuclear nonproliferation, and large-scale energy infrastructure systems.

On September 20, 2004, Jones became the Assistant Dean for Graduate Students at MIT. During his tenure, graduate applications from underrepresented minorities tripled (from 300 to 1300) and enrollment doubled (14 percent). He left the position in April 2013.

In May 2013, Jones was hired as the executive director of Dudley Street Neighborhood Initiative, a non-profit organization focused on improving one of Boston's poorest areas. He supervised day-to-day operations and performance of the organization. While he was there, Jones oversaw rapid growth due to a $6 million federal grant, Promise Neighborhoods. He supervised a $3.4 million budget as executive director. Prior to his role as executive director, Jones was a vice president on the board and volunteered at the organization. Jones was also appointed by Boston mayor Martin J. Walsh to the “Neighborhood Innovation District Committee” which was intended to improve economic development across the city.

In 2015, Chris Jones left Dudley Street Neighborhood initiative for BCT Partners, a consulting firm. At BCT Partners, he led many large federal projects.

On March 12, 2018, Jones was hired as the executive director and lead maker of the Arkansas Regional Innovation Hub. The Innovation Hub is a nonprofit in North Little Rock, Arkansas, that is affiliated with Winrock International. In 2020, Jones announced a partnership with Scenic Hill Solar to create a solar power plant, a community based solar project that powered the Innovation Hub's energy needs. At the beginning of the COVID-19 pandemic, the Innovation Hub launched the Arkansas Maker Task Force, which included over 260 Arkansas makers who helped make personal protection equipment at the beginning of the pandemic. In 2021, Jones partnered with two Fortune 500 companies to expand the organization's outreach in Central Arkansas. Partnerships included the MIT Media Lab, Best Buy, Gilead Sciences, Inc, and the North Little Rock School District. Jones met regularly with Venture Center and Startup Junkie to collaborate on how to best help startups. Jones stepped down as the director of the Innovation Hub on April 29, 2021.

Jones was appointed by Governor Asa Hutchinson to the board of directors of the Division of Science and Technology of the Arkansas Economic Development Commission. He served from March 2020 through January 2022.

Jones is also an ordained minister.

Jones is currently employed as the Director of Community and Social Innovation with BCT partners.

=== Recognition ===
For his efforts as an assistant dean at MIT, Jones received the Irwin Sizer Award for Significant Improvements to MIT Education for his work leading the MIT Summer Research Program Design Team. He shared this recognition with Professor Paula T. Hammond.

Jones was a member of Class XIV of Leadership Arkansas, a group selected by the Arkansas State Chamber of Commerce to learn about issues facing people in Arkansas.

In 2020, Jones was chosen as one of three Arkansans for the Presidential Leadership Scholars program, which included visits to the presidential libraries of Lyndon B. Johnson, Bill Clinton, George H.W. Bush, and George W. Bush.

== 2022 Arkansas gubernatorial election ==
On June 15, 2021, Jones announced his intention to run for governor of Arkansas. He also released what became a viral biographical video, "About Time", describing Jones's educational background and intent to bring innovation to Arkansas. The video later won two Pollie awards from the American Association of Political Consultants.

Jones said he was running because he wanted to "focus on solutions, not politics." He cited rebuilding infrastructure, investing in healthcare and education and expanding rural broadband as his goals. Jones had not previously run for an elected position.

=== Primary election ===
Results by county: Jones: 20-30%; 30-40%; 40-50%; 50–60%; 60–70%; 70–80%; 80-90%

Jones spoke of his intent to unite Arkansans, mentioning the low level of voter participation. By mid-October, Jones had raised over $1 million. Jones maintained the front-runner status throughout the primary race, in both opinion polls and fundraising.

In February, Jones visited all 75 counties of Arkansas during "The Promise of Arkansas Tour". On the tour, Jones discussed his "PB&J" policy agenda: preschool, broadband, and jobs, citing Arkansas's ranking in the bottom of education. The tour also served as a listening tour where Jones said that he could learn what issues mattered most to Arkansans. Jones argued that the state could fulfill its promise through "faith, hope, and hard work."

Besides Jones, there were four additional candidates in the Democratic primary: Anthony Bland, Jay Martin, James Russell and Supha Xayprasith-Mays. The primary election was held on May 24, 2022. Jones handily won the race with 70.4% of the vote.

Jones became the first Black candidate to run for governor from the Democratic Party, and the first Black candidate to win the Democratic primary for a state-wide office.

=== General election ===
After winning the primary, Jones announced the "Walk a Mile In Your Shoes Tour". This tour is the second time that the campaign went to each county across the state. Jones said that his campaign was about "neighbors talking to neighbors". Others noted that this strategy was very different from that of the Republican candidate.

In the general election, Jones was against Republican Sarah Huckabee Sanders, Donald Trump's former press secretary, and Libertarian Ricky Dale Harrington Jr. Jones lost the November 8 election by a large margin, with Sanders commanding just under 63% of the statewide vote.

== 2026 congressional election ==
On March 3, 2026, Jones won the Democratic primary against Zack Huff with 92.6% of the vote (47,512). Conducted between April 28 and May 8, an internal poll by 2040 Strategy Group found Jones leading incumbent French Hill, 46% to 43%, respectively, among modeled likely voters. To commemorate Juneteenth, Former United States Secretary of Transportation Pete Buttigieg traveled to Arkansas and endorsed Chris Jones, in the form of a rally filled to capacity in Little Rock.

On August 10, 2026, the Democratic Congressional Campaign Committee (DCCC) added Arkansas House District 2 to a targeted district list, "signaling Democrats' readiness to reclaim the House majority by widening the battlefield and working to defeat French Hill."As of August 20, 2026, a Hendrix College Talk Business & Politics poll confirmed Jones’ congressional lead, up 48% against Hill’s 44%, "with 8 percent of likely voters undecided." This "suggested a considerably closer contest than the one Hill won two years earlier."

August 26, 2026, saw the historic endorsement of the Chris Jones campaign by former Vice President Kamala D. Harris, who said "Arkansans deserve a fighter in their corner, and Chris Jones has shown he is ready to fight for the people. I’m proud to support him in this race." Just two weeks before early voting began, the DCCC categorized the campaign within its ‘Red to Blue’ program, meaning national Democrats see the 2026 race as one of the most competitive in the country.

Jones narrowly lost the election to Hill by 1.8% and conceded to Hill.

== Personal life ==
Jones's parents are both preachers; his father also sold insurance and his mother is also a retired teacher.

Jones married Jerrilyn Jones in 2001. Jerrilyn Jones is an Air Force combat veteran who worked as a flight surgeon in the 75th Fighter Squadron during Operation Enduring Freedom in Afghanistan. Jerrilyn is currently an emergency room physician and associate professor of emergency medicine at the University of Arkansas Medical Sciences (UAMS). At UAMS, Jerrilyn became the inaugural director of the post-baccalaureate program, which intends to serve as a bridge for students who may have a difficult time getting admitted to emergency medicine. Jerrilyn Jones also serves as medical director of preparedness at the Arkansas Department of Health. In 2021, Jones received the Arkansas First Lady's Woman in Public Service Award.

Jones's older brother Leon Jones is a longtime member of the Republican Party. Leon Jones ran for the office of Arkansas Attorney General in the 2022 Republican primary election, but he did not win. Chris Jones said having a brother in a different party gave him practice speaking with voters from both parties.

Party political offices
| Preceded by Jared Henderson | Democratic nominee for Governor of Arkansas; 2022 | Succeeded by Fredrick Love |
