= 2022 Arkansas gubernatorial election =

- November 8, 2022
- Turnout: 50.81% ▼
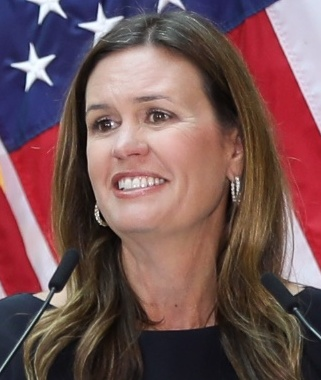

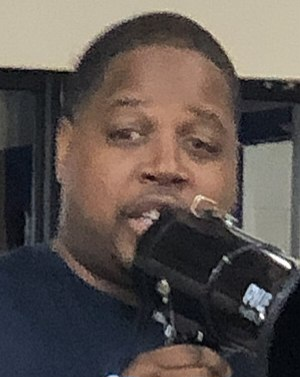
Nominee	Sarah Huckabee Sanders	Chris Jones
Party	Republican	Democratic
Popular vote	571,105	319,242
Percentage	62.96%	35.20%
- Sanders: 40–50% 50–60% 60–70% 70–80% 80–90% Jones: 40–50% 50–60% 60–70%
Governor before election
Asa Hutchinson
Republican
Elected Governor
Sarah Huckabee Sanders
Republican

The 2022 Arkansas gubernatorial election took place on November 8, 2022, to elect the next governor of Arkansas. Incumbent Republican Governor Asa Hutchinson was term-limited and could not seek a third term. Republican Sarah Huckabee Sanders, daughter of former Arkansas Governor Mike Huckabee, defeated Democrat Chris Jones to become the state’s first female governor, and was sworn in on January 10, 2023.

Primary elections in Arkansas were held on May 24. Runoff elections for instances where no candidate receives over 50% of the vote were scheduled for June 21. Former White House Press Secretary Sanders won the Republican nomination, while Jones won the Democratic nomination.

Leading up to the Republican primary, Sanders received many endorsements from key Republican figures, including Donald Trump, Mike Pence, incumbent Asa Hutchinson, Arkansas' entire U.S. congressional delegation, and the majority of Republicans in both state legislative chambers. She faced little substantive opposition in the primary, as she won every county in the state with at least 70% of the vote.

As Arkansas is a staunchly Republican state, winning the party's nomination virtually guaranteed a victory for Sanders in the general election, in which she defeated Jones by 28 points. Jones became the first Democrat to win Washington County since 2010, and Sanders became the first Republican to win majority-Black Crittenden County since her father in 1998, winning the county by one vote. This was the only 2022 election in which Washington County voted against the Republican nominee. This is the first time ever that the Republican Party won three straight gubernatorial elections in the state's history.

Sanders became the first female governor of Arkansas. With the election of Leslie Rutledge as lieutenant governor, Arkansas, along with Massachusetts, became one of two U.S. states to elect both a female governor and female lieutenant governor in the same election.

== Republican primary ==
=== Candidates ===
==== Nominee ====
- Sarah Huckabee Sanders, former White House press secretary (2017–2019) and daughter of former governor Mike Huckabee

==== Eliminated in primary ====
- Francis "Doc" Washburn, radio personality

==== Withdrew ====
- Tim Griffin, lieutenant governor of Arkansas (2015–2023) (successfully ran for attorney general) (endorsed Sanders)
- Leslie Rutledge, Arkansas attorney general (2015–2023) (successfully ran for lieutenant governor) (endorsed Sanders)

=== Endorsements ===
Sarah Huckabee Sanders

U.S. executive branch officials

- Mike Pence, 48th vice president of the United States (2017–2021)
- Mike Pompeo, former secretary of state (2018–2021)
- Matt Schlapp, White House director of political affairs (2003–2005)
- Donald Trump, 45th president of the United States (2017–2021)

U.S. senators

- John Boozman, senator from Arkansas (2011–present)
- Tom Cotton, senator from Arkansas (2015–present)

U.S. representatives

- Rick Crawford, U.S. representative from Arkansas's 1st congressional district (2011–present)
- French Hill, U.S. representative from Arkansas's 2nd congressional district (2015–present)
- Bruce Westerman, U.S. representative from Arkansas's 4th congressional district (2015–present)
- Steve Womack, U.S. representative from Arkansas's 3rd congressional district (2011–present)

U.S. governors

- Mike Huckabee, former governor of Arkansas (1996–2007) and candidate for president of the United States in 2008 and 2016 (candidate's father)
- Asa Hutchinson, Governor of Arkansas (2015–2023)

State officials

- Bob Ballinger, state senator from District 5 (2019–2023)
- Sonia Eubanks Barker, state representative from District 7 (2016–present)
- Howard Beaty, state representative from District 9 (2021–present)
- Mary Bentley, state representative from District 73 (2015–present)
- Cecile Bledsoe, state senator from District 3 (2013–present)
- Ken Bragg, state representative from District 15 (2013–present)
- Karilyn Brown, state representative from District 41 (2015–present)
- Ron Caldwell, state senator from District 23 (2013–present)
- Alan Clark, state senator from District 13 (2013–present)
- Cameron Cooper, state representative from District 44 (2019–present)
- Bruce Cozart, state representative from District 24 (2011–present)
- Carol Dalby, state representative from District 1 (2017–present)
- Breanne Davis, state senator from District 29 (2018–present)
- Marsh Davis, state representative from District 61 (2019–present)
- Jonathan Dismang, state senator from District 28 (2013–present)
- Les Eaves, state representative from District 46 (2015–present)
- Jane English, state senator from District 34 (2013–present)
- John Eubanks, state representative from District 74 (2011–present)
- Charlene Fite, state representative from District 80 (2013–present)
- Lanny Fite, state representative from District 23 (2015–present)
- Scott Flippo, majority leader of the Arkansas Senate (2021–present) and state senator from District 17 (2015–present)
- Tony Furman, state representative from District 28 (2021–present)
- Trent Garner, state senator from District 27 (2017–present)
- Jimmy Gazaway, state representative from District 57 (2017–present)
- Justin Gonzales, state representative from District 19 (2015–present)
- Michelle Gray, state representative from District 62 (2015–present)
- Tim Griffin, lieutenant governor of Arkansas (2015–present)
- Delia Haak, state representative from District 91 (2021–present)
- Kim Hammer, state senator from District 33 (2019–present)
- Spencer Hawks, state representative from District 70 (2019–present)
- Bart Hester, state senator from District 1 (2013–present)
- Jimmy Hickey Jr., president pro tempore of the Arkansas Senate (2021–present) and state senator from District 11 (2013–present)
- Ricky Hill, state senator from District 29 (2018–present)
- David Hillman, state representative from District 13 (2013–present)
- Mike Holcomb, state representative from District 10 (2013–present)
- Missy Irvin, state senator from District 18 (2013–present)
- Lane Jean, state representative from District 2 (2013–present) and District 4 (2011–2012)
- Joe Jett, state representative from District 56 (2013–present)
- Vernon Jones, state representative for District 91 (2017–2021) and District 71 (1993–2001)
- Jack Ladyman, state representative from District 59 (2015–present)
- Mark Lowery, state representative from District 39 (2013–2023)
- Robin Lundstrum, state representative from District 87 (2015–present)
- Roger Lynch, state representative from District 14 (2017–present)
- Julie Mayberry, state representative from District 27 (2015–present)
- Austin McCollum, state representative from District 95 (2017–present)
- Mark McElroy, state representative from District 11 (2021–present)
- Aaron Pilkington, state representative from District 69 (2017–present)
- Mathew Pitsch, state senator from District 8 (2019–2023)
- Jason Rapert, state senator from District 35 (2013–present) and District 18 (2011–2013)
- Terry Rice, state senator from District 9 (2015–present)
- Marcus Richmond, state representative from District 21 (2015–present)
- Bill Sample, state senator from District 14 (2011–present)
- Matthew Shepherd, speaker of the State Representative (2018–present) and state representative from District 6 (2011–present)
- Nelda Speaks, state representative from District 100 (2015–present)
- Gary Stubblefield, state senator from District 6 (2013–present)
- James Sturch, state senator from District 19 (2019–present)
- Dan Sullivan, state senator from District 21 (2021–present)
- David Tollett, state representative from District 12 (2021–present)
- Dwight Tosh, state representative from District 52 (2015–present)
- Kendon Underwood, state representative from District 90 (2021–present)
- DeAnn Vaught, state representative from District 4 (2015–present)
- Jeff Wardlaw, state representative from District 8 (2011–present)
- Danny Watson, state representative from District 3 (2017–present)
- Richard Womack, state representative from District 18 (2013–present)

Individuals

- Kid Rock, musician
- Donald Trump Jr., businessman and son of former president Donald Trump

Organizations

- American Conservative Union
- Maggie's List

=== Polling ===
Poll source	Date(s) administered	Sample size (Note: Key: A – all adults RV – registered voters LV – likely voters V – unclear)	Margin of error	Leslie Rutledge	Sarah Huckabee Sanders	Francis Washburn	Undecided
Hendrix College	May 2, 2022	802 (LV)	± 4.3%	–	73%	17%	10%
Remington Research (R)	May 1–2, 2022	1,622 (LV)	± 2.2%	–	80%	14%	6%
	November 9, 2021	Rutledge withdraws from the race					
Remington Research (R)	October 25–26, 2021	800 (LV)	± 3.5%	16%	73%	–	11%
Hendrix College	May 26–31, 2021	535 (LV)	± 5.5%	35%	43%	–	22%

=== Results ===
Results by county: Sanders: 70–80%; 80–90%; >90%

Republican primary results
Party	Candidate	Votes	%
Republican	Sarah Huckabee Sanders	289,249	83.14%
Republican	Francis "Doc" Washburn	58,638	16.86%
Total votes		347,887	100.0%

== Democratic primary ==
=== Candidates ===
==== Nominee ====
- Chris Jones, nuclear engineer and nonprofit executive

==== Eliminated in primary ====
- Anthony Bland, public school teacher and nominee for lieutenant governor in 2018
- Jay Martin, lawyer and former majority leader of the Arkansas House of Representatives
- James "Rus" Russell, small business owner
- Supha Xayprasith-Mays, entrepreneur

==== Declined ====
- Kelly Krout, candidate for state representative in 2020 (unsuccessfully ran for lieutenant governor)
- Greg Leding, state senator (2019–present), former state representative (2011–2019), and former minority leader of the Arkansas House of Representatives (2012–2014) (successfully ran for re-election to the State Senate)
- Clarke Tucker, state senator (2021–present), former state representative (2015–2019), and nominee for Arkansas's 2nd congressional district in 2018 (successfully ran for re-election to the State Senate)

=== Endorsements ===
Chris Jones

Newspaper and other media

- Arkansas Democrat-Gazette (Democratic primary only)

Organizations

- 314 Action
- The Collective PAC
- Democracy for America
Supha Xayprasith-Mays

Governors

- Jim Guy Tucker, former governor of Arkansas (1992–1996)

Statewide officials

- Richard Mays, former associate justice of the Arkansas Supreme Court (1979–1980) (candidate's husband)

=== Polling ===
Poll source	Date(s) administered	Sample size	Margin of error	Anthony Bland	Chris Jones	Supha Xayprasith-Mays	Jay Martin	James Russell	Undecided
Hendrix College	May 2, 2022	597 (LV)	± 5.0%	3%	60%	2%	3%	2%	31%

=== Results ===
Results by county: Jones: 30–40%; 40–50%; 50–60%; 60–70%; 70–80%; 80–90%

Democratic primary results
Party	Candidate	Votes	%
Democratic	Chris Jones	66,540	70.43%
Democratic	Anthony Bland	9,055	9.58%
Democratic	Jay Martin	7,731	8.18%
Democratic	James "Rus" Russell	6,421	6.80%
Democratic	Supha Xayprasith-Mays	4,725	5.00%
Total votes		94,472	100.0%

== Libertarian convention ==
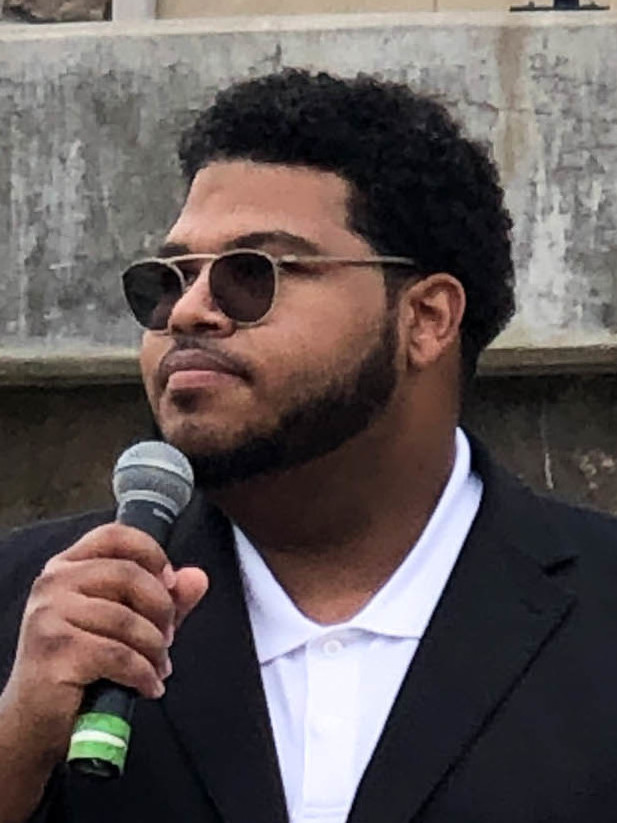
The Libertarian nominee, prison chaplain Ricky Harrington from Pine Bluff

=== Candidates ===
==== Nominee ====
- Ricky Harrington, Christian missionary, prison chaplain, and nominee for U.S. senator in 2020

== General election ==
=== Predictions ===
Source	Ranking	As of
The Cook Political Report	Solid R	March 4, 2022
Inside Elections	Solid R	March 4, 2022
Sabato's Crystal Ball	Safe R	January 26, 2022
Politico	Solid R	April 1, 2022
RCP	Safe R	January 10, 2022
Fox News	Solid R	May 12, 2022
538	Solid R	June 30, 2022
Elections Daily	Safe R	November 7, 2022

=== Post-primary endorsements ===
Chris Jones (D)

Labor unions

- Communications Workers of America

=== Polling ===
Aggregate polls

Source of poll aggregation	Dates administered	Dates updated	Sarah Huckabee Sanders (R)	Chris Jones (D)	Undecided (Note: Calculated by taking the difference of 100% and all other candidates combined.)	Margin
FiveThirtyEight	August 31 – October 31, 2022	November 3, 2022	54.4%	36.1%	9.5%	Sanders +18.3

Graphical summary

Poll source	Date(s) administered	Sample size	Margin of error	Sarah Huckabee Sanders (R)	Chris Jones (D)	Ricky Harrington (L)	Undecided
University of Arkansas	October 13–31, 2022	557 (LV)	–	53%	34%	4%	9%
Hendrix College	October 17–18, 2022	835 (LV)	± 3.8%	51%	41%	3%	5%
Remington Research Group (R)	September 14–15, 2022	1,418 (LV)	± 3.4%	59%	34%	3%	4%
Hendrix College	September 12, 2022	835 (LV)	± 3.8%	51%	40%	2%	7%
Echelon Insights	August 31 – September 7, 2022	382 (RV)	± 7.7%	62%	32%	–	6%
Remington Research Group (R)	February 26–27, 2022	827 (LV)	± 3.4%	58%	28%	3%	10%

Hypothetical polling

Sarah Huckabee Sanders vs. generic Democrat

Poll source	Date(s) administered	Sample size	Margin of error	Sarah Huckabee Sanders (R)	Generic Democrat	Other	Undecided
Hendrix College	February 7–8, 2022	961 (LV)	± 4.4%	44%	34%	8%	15%

Generic Republican vs. generic Democrat

Poll source	Date(s) administered	Sample size	Margin of error	Generic Republican	Generic Democrat	Undecided
University of Arkansas	October 12–24, 2021	800 (A)	± 3.5%	46%	21%	34%
University of Arkansas	October 12–24, 2021	555 (LV)	± 4.2%	50%	23%	27%

=== Debates ===
2022 Arkansas gubernatorial debates
No.	Date	Host	Moderator	Link	Republican	Democratic	Libertarian
Key: P Participant A Absent N Non-invitee I Invitee W Withdrawn							
Key: P Participant A Absent N Non-invitee I Invitee W Withdrawn					Sarah Huckabee Sanders	Chris Jones	Ricky Harrington Jr
1	Oct, 2022	Arkansas PBS	Steve Barnes		P	P	P

=== Results ===
2022 Arkansas gubernatorial election
Party	Candidate	Votes	%	±%
Republican	Sarah Huckabee Sanders	571,105	62.96%	–2.37%
Democratic	Chris Jones	319,242	35.20%	+3.43%
Libertarian	Ricky Dale Harrington Jr.	16,690	1.84%	–1.06%
Total votes		907,037	100.00%	N/A
Republican hold				

==== By county ====
County	Sarah Huckabee Sanders Republican		Chris Jones Democratic		Ricky Dale Harrington Jr. Libertarian		Margin		Total
County	#	%	#	%	#	%	#	%	Total
Arkansas	3,197	71.22%	1,231	27.42%	61	1.36%	1,966	43.80%	4,489
Ashley	4,012	73.47%	1,386	25.38%	63	1.15%	2,626	48.09%	5,461
Baxter	12,098	77.21%	3,293	21.02%	277	1.77%	8,805	56.20%	15,668
Benton	55,907	61.51%	33,000	36.30%	1,990	2.19%	22,907	25.20%	90,897
Boone	10,127	79.42%	2,319	18.19%	305	2.39%	7,808	61.23%	12,751
Bradley	1,764	66.92%	846	32.09%	26	0.99%	918	34.83%	2,636
Calhoun	1,248	78.54%	324	20.39%	17	1.07%	924	58.15%	1,589
Carroll	5,692	62.96%	3,158	34.93%	190	2.10%	2,534	28.03%	9,040
Chicot	1,601	47.01%	1,782	52.32%	23	0.68%	-181	-5.31%	3,406
Clark	3,492	56.62%	2,589	41.98%	86	1.39%	903	14.64%	6,167
Clay	3,060	77.59%	798	20.23%	86	2.18%	2,262	57.35%	3,944
Cleburne	8,252	82.17%	1,608	16.01%	182	1.81%	6,644	66.16%	10,042
Cleveland	2,305	81.88%	479	17.02%	31	1.10%	1,826	64.87%	2,815
Columbia	4,066	66.80%	1,937	31.82%	84	1.38%	2,129	34.98%	6,087
Conway	4,481	66.25%	2,176	32.17%	107	1.58%	2,305	34.08%	6,764
Craighead	18,171	65.57%	8,980	32.40%	561	2.02%	9,191	33.17%	27,712
Crawford	13,814	76.92%	3,778	21.04%	367	2.04%	10,036	55.88%	17,959
Crittenden	5,295	49.25%	5,294	49.24%	163	1.52%	1	0.01%	10,752
Cross	3,672	74.41%	1,174	23.79%	89	1.80%	2,498	50.62%	4,935
Dallas	1,331	63.68%	732	35.02%	27	1.29%	599	28.66%	2,090
Desha	1,611	51.80%	1,464	47.07%	35	1.13%	147	4.73%	3,110
Drew	3,380	63.63%	1,871	35.22%	61	1.15%	1,509	28.41%	5,312
Faulkner	25,382	62.93%	14,131	35.03%	822	2.04%	11,251	27.89%	40,335
Franklin	4,130	75.88%	1,213	22.29%	100	1.84%	2,917	53.59%	5,443
Fulton	3,045	76.43%	834	20.93%	105	2.64%	2,211	55.50%	3,984
Garland	22,225	66.66%	10,493	31.47%	622	1.87%	11,732	35.19%	33,340
Grant	5,112	81.31%	1,055	16.78%	120	1.91%	4,057	64.53%	6,287
Greene	8,982	77.69%	2,330	20.15%	250	2.16%	6,652	57.53%	11,562
Hempstead	3,311	70.67%	1,316	28.09%	58	1.24%	1,995	42.58%	4,685
Hot Spring	7,230	72.74%	2,528	25.44%	181	1.82%	4,702	47.31%	9,939
Howard	2,580	70.84%	1,000	27.46%	62	1.70%	1,580	43.38%	3,642
Independence	8,077	76.31%	2,316	21.88%	192	1.81%	5,761	54.43%	10,585
Izard	3,636	79.10%	861	18.73%	100	2.18%	2,775	60.37%	4,597
Jackson	2,860	70.84%	1,106	27.40%	71	1.76%	1,754	43.45%	4,037
Jefferson	6,874	39.29%	10,466	59.82%	157	0.90%	-3,592	-20.53%	17,497
Johnson	5,071	72.34%	1,791	25.55%	148	2.11%	3,280	46.79%	7,010
Lafayette	1,286	64.88%	674	34.01%	22	1.11%	612	30.88%	1,982
Lawrence	3,655	78.74%	876	18.87%	111	2.39%	2,779	59.87%	4,642
Lee	983	48.74%	1,012	50.17%	22	1.09%	-29	-1.44%	2,017
Lincoln	2,015	72.56%	730	26.29%	32	1.15%	1,285	46.27%	2,777
Little River	2,906	76.17%	835	21.89%	74	1.94%	2,071	54.29%	3,815
Logan	4,854	77.56%	1,265	20.21%	139	2.22%	3,589	57.35%	6,258
Lonoke	16,603	74.22%	5,287	23.63%	480	2.15%	11,316	50.59%	22,370
Madison	4,403	75.69%	1,304	22.42%	110	1.89%	3,099	53.27%	5,817
Marion	4,744	79.04%	1,119	18.64%	139	2.32%	3,625	60.40%	6,002
Miller	8,571	76.06%	2,523	22.39%	174	1.54%	6,048	53.67%	11,268
Mississippi	5,401	62.13%	3,092	35.57%	200	2.30%	2,309	26.56%	8,693
Monroe	1,233	55.02%	977	43.60%	31	1.38%	256	11.42%	2,241
Montgomery	2,471	79.17%	578	18.52%	72	2.31%	1,893	60.65%	3,121
Nevada	1,658	67.29%	780	31.66%	26	1.06%	878	35.63%	2,464
Newton	2,440	79.22%	557	18.08%	83	2.69%	1,883	61.14%	3,080
Ouachita	4,065	57.88%	2,863	40.77%	95	1.35%	1,202	17.12%	7,023
Perry	2,873	75.25%	871	22.81%	74	1.94%	2,002	52.44%	3,818
Phillips	1,892	43.33%	2,415	55.31%	59	1.35%	-523	-11.98%	4,366
Pike	3,121	83.81%	552	14.82%	51	1.37%	2,569	68.98%	3,724
Poinsett	4,386	78.76%	1,050	18.85%	133	2.39%	3,336	59.90%	5,569
Polk	5,634	81.57%	1,123	16.26%	150	2.17%	4,511	65.31%	6,907
Pope	12,928	73.33%	4,418	25.06%	284	1.61%	8,510	48.27%	17,630
Prairie	2,167	81.22%	459	17.20%	42	1.57%	1,708	64.02%	2,668
Pulaski	47,027	37.88%	75,393	60.73%	1,733	1.40%	-28,366	-22.85%	124,153
Randolph	4,201	78.42%	1,026	19.15%	130	2.43%	3,175	59.27%	5,357
Saline	29,872	69.20%	12,532	29.03%	766	1.77%	17,340	40.17%	43,170
Scott	2,498	84.36%	407	13.75%	56	1.89%	2,091	70.62%	2,961
Searcy	2,608	82.27%	492	15.52%	70	2.21%	2,116	66.75%	3,170
Sebastian	22,939	66.73%	10,734	31.23%	703	2.05%	12,205	35.50%	34,376
Sevier	2,825	77.12%	784	21.40%	54	1.47%	2,041	55.72%	3,663
Sharp	4,816	79.64%	1,056	17.46%	175	2.89%	3,760	62.18%	6,047
St. Francis	2,477	48.74%	2,527	49.72%	78	1.53%	-50	-0.98%	5,082
Stone	3,936	77.04%	1,070	20.94%	103	2.02%	2,866	56.10%	5,109
Union	7,826	66.93%	3,695	31.60%	172	1.47%	4,131	35.33%	11,693
Van Buren	4,810	76.68%	1,335	21.28%	128	2.04%	3,475	55.40%	6,273
Washington	34,361	48.63%	34,842	49.31%	1,453	2.06%	-481	-0.68%	70,656
White	18,010	77.88%	4,613	19.95%	502	2.17%	13,397	57.93%	23,125
Woodruff	1,347	64.39%	695	33.22%	50	2.39%	652	31.17%	2,092
Yell	4,172	78.88%	1,022	19.32%	95	1.80%	3,150	59.56%	5,289
Totals	571,105	62.96%	319,242	35.20%	16,690	1.84%	251,863	27.77%	907,037

==== Counties that flipped from Democratic to Republican ====
- Crittenden (largest city: West Memphis)

==== Counties that flipped from Republican to Democratic ====
- Washington (largest city: Fayetteville)

==== By congressional district ====
Huckabee Sanders won all four congressional districts.

District	Huckabee Sanders	Jones	Representative
1st	70%	28%	Rick Crawford
2nd	56%	43%	French Hill
3rd	60%	38%	Steve Womack
4th	68%	30%	Bruce Westerman

== See also ==
- 2022 Arkansas elections
