= 2022 Arkansas lieutenant gubernatorial election =

- November 8, 2022
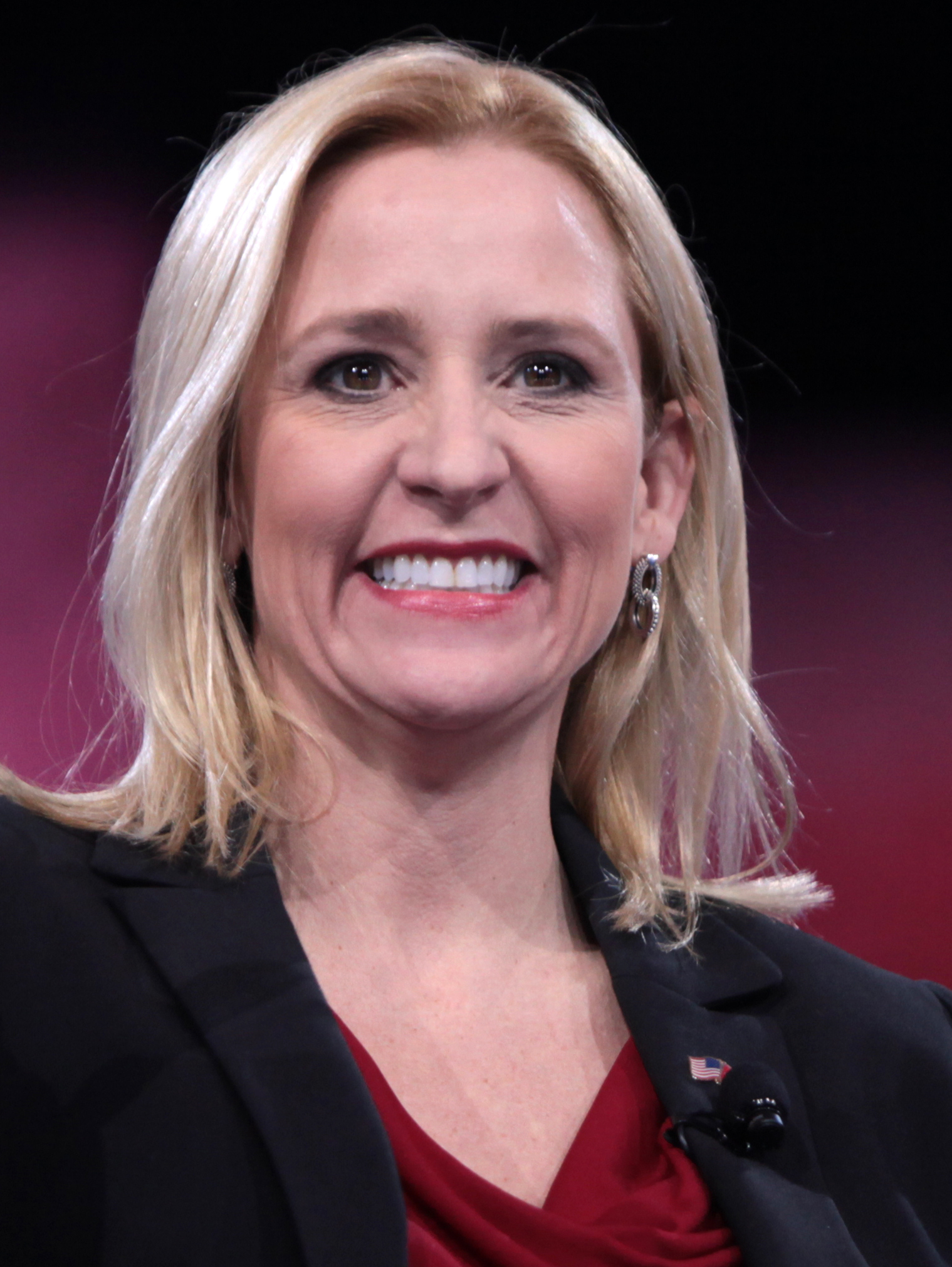

| Nominee | Leslie Rutledge | Kelly Krout |
| Party | Republican | Democratic |
| Popular vote | 577,312 | 288,631 |
| Percentage | 64.21% | 32.10% |
- Rutledge: 40–50% 50–60% 60–70% 70–80% 80–90% Krout: 40–50% 50–60%
Lieutenant Governor before election
Tim Griffin
Republican
Elected Lieutenant Governor
Leslie Rutledge
Republican

The 2022 Arkansas lieutenant gubernatorial election was held on November 8, 2022, to elect the lieutenant governor of the state of Arkansas. The election coincided with various other federal and state elections, including for Governor of Arkansas. Primary elections were held on May 24. Arkansas is one of 21 states that elects its lieutenant governor separately from its governor.

Incumbent Republican lieutenant governor Tim Griffin was barred by the Constitution of Arkansas from running for a third term; he instead ran successfully for attorney general. Griffin was re-elected in 2018 with 64.2% of the vote.

Republican Attorney General Leslie Rutledge won the election, handily defeating her Democratic opponent Kelly Krout. She became the first woman elected lieutenant governor of Arkansas, coinciding with the election of Sarah Huckabee Sanders as the first woman elected governor of Arkansas.

== Republican primary ==
=== Candidates ===
==== Nominee ====
- Leslie Rutledge, Arkansas Attorney General

==== Eliminated in primary ====
- Chris Bequette, lawyer and financial adviser
- Greg Bledsoe, Arkansas Surgeon General
- Jason Rapert, state senator
- Doyle Webb, former chair of the Republican Party of Arkansas and former state senator
- Joseph K. Wood, Washington County judge

=== Endorsements ===
Leslie Rutledge

Newspapers and other media

- Arkansas Democrat-Gazette

=== Polling ===
| Poll source | Date(s) administered | Sample size (Note: Key: A – all adults RV – registered voters LV – likely voters V – unclear) | Margin of error | Chris Bequette | Greg Bledsoe | Jason Rapert | Leslie Rutledge | Doyle Webb | Joseph Wood | Undecided |
|---|---|---|---|---|---|---|---|---|---|---|
| Hendrix College | May 2, 2022 | 802 (LV) | ± 4.3% | 5% | 9% | 11% | 40% | 4% | 7% | 25% |

=== Results ===
Results by county Rutledge: 40–50%; 50–60%; 60–70%; 70–80%; Rapert: 50–60%

Republican primary results
| Party | Candidate | Votes | % |
|---|---|---|---|
| Republican | Leslie Rutledge | 183,888 | 54.00 |
| Republican | Jason Rapert | 50,063 | 14.70 |
| Republican | Greg Bledsoe | 33,722 | 9.90 |
| Republican | Joesph Wood | 29,277 | 8.60 |
| Republican | Doyle Webb | 23,188 | 6.81 |
| Republican | Chris Bequette | 20,411 | 5.99 |
| Total votes | | 340,549 | 100.00 |

== Democratic primary ==
=== Candidates ===
==== Nominee ====
- Kelly Krout, graduate student and candidate for Arkansas House of Representatives in 2020

==== Withdrew ====
- Drew Pritt, small business owner (running for state house)

=== Endorsements ===
Kelly Krout

Organizations

- Everytown for Gun Safety Action Fund

== Libertarian primary ==
=== Candidates ===
==== Nominee ====
- Frank Gilbert, former mayor of Tull and perennial candidate

== General election ==
=== Debate ===
2022 Arkansas lieutenant gubernatorial debate
| No. | Date | Host | Moderator | Link | Democratic | Republican | Libertarian |
| Key: P Participant A Absent N Not invited I Invited W Withdrawn | | | | | | | |
| Key: P Participant A Absent N Not invited I Invited W Withdrawn | | | | | Kelly Krout | Leslie Rutledge | Frank Gilbert |
|---|---|---|---|---|---|---|---|
| 1 | Oct. 18, 2022 | Arkansas PBS | Steve Barnes | YouTube | P | P | P |

=== Results ===
2022 Arkansas lieutenant gubernatorial election
| Party | Candidate | Votes | % | ±% |
|---|---|---|---|---|
| Republican | Leslie Rutledge | 577,316 | 64.21% | +0.03 |
| Democratic | Kelly Krout | 288,631 | 32.10% | –0.93 |
| Libertarian | Frank Gilbert | 33,163 | 3.69% | +0.90 |
| Total votes | | 899,110 | 100.00% | N/A |
| Republican hold | | | | |

==== By county ====
| County | Leslie Rutledge Republican | | Kelly Krout Democratic | | Frank Gilbert Libertarian | | Margin | | Total |
| County | # | % | # | % | # | % | # | % | Total |
|---|---|---|---|---|---|---|---|---|---|
| Arkansas | 3,291 | 73.89% | 1,059 | 23.78% | 104 | 2.33% | 2,232 | 50.11% | 4,454 |
| Ashley | 4,074 | 74.83% | 1,240 | 22.78% | 130 | 2.39% | 2,834 | 52.06% | 5,444 |
| Baxter | 11,914 | 76.77% | 3,013 | 19.41% | 592 | 3.81% | 8,901 | 57.36% | 15,519 |
| Benton | 56,549 | 62.45% | 30,260 | 33.42% | 3,737 | 4.13% | 26,289 | 29.03% | 90,546 |
| Boone | 10,022 | 79.21% | 2,144 | 16.94% | 487 | 3.85% | 7,878 | 62.26% | 12,653 |
| Bradley | 1,796 | 68.79% | 741 | 28.38% | 74 | 2.83% | 1,055 | 40.41% | 2,611 |
| Calhoun | 1,260 | 79.60% | 289 | 18.26% | 34 | 2.15% | 971 | 61.34% | 1,583 |
| Carroll | 5,782 | 64.27% | 2,925 | 32.51% | 290 | 3.22% | 2,857 | 31.76% | 8,997 |
| Chicot | 1,649 | 48.67% | 1,685 | 49.73% | 54 | 1.59% | -36 | -1.06% | 3,388 |
| Clark | 3,520 | 58.29% | 2,326 | 38.52% | 193 | 3.20% | 1,194 | 19.77% | 6,039 |
| Clay | 3,105 | 79.33% | 690 | 17.63% | 119 | 3.04% | 2,415 | 61.70% | 3,914 |
| Cleburne | 8,272 | 82.62% | 1,436 | 14.34% | 304 | 3.04% | 6,836 | 68.28% | 10,012 |
| Cleveland | 2,338 | 83.50% | 398 | 14.21% | 64 | 2.29% | 1,940 | 69.29% | 2,800 |
| Columbia | 4,070 | 67.41% | 1,825 | 30.23% | 143 | 2.37% | 2,245 | 37.18% | 6,038 |
| Conway | 4,486 | 66.93% | 1,955 | 29.17% | 262 | 3.91% | 2,531 | 37.76% | 6,703 |
| Craighead | 18,544 | 67.26% | 8,001 | 29.02% | 1,025 | 3.72% | 10,543 | 38.24% | 27,570 |
| Crawford | 13,266 | 76.96% | 3,222 | 18.69% | 750 | 4.35% | 10,044 | 58.27% | 17,238 |
| Crittenden | 5,305 | 49.93% | 5,033 | 47.37% | 286 | 2.69% | 272 | 2.56% | 10,624 |
| Cross | 3,712 | 75.46% | 1,101 | 22.38% | 106 | 2.15% | 2,611 | 53.08% | 4,919 |
| Dallas | 1,364 | 66.70% | 619 | 30.27% | 62 | 3.03% | 745 | 36.43% | 2,045 |
| Desha | 1,615 | 55.25% | 1,196 | 40.92% | 112 | 3.83% | 419 | 14.33% | 2,923 |
| Drew | 3,490 | 66.72% | 1,593 | 30.45% | 148 | 2.83% | 1,897 | 36.26% | 5,231 |
| Faulkner | 25,621 | 64.13% | 12,627 | 31.61% | 1,704 | 4.27% | 12,994 | 32.52% | 39,952 |
| Franklin | 4,071 | 77.06% | 990 | 18.74% | 222 | 4.20% | 3,081 | 58.32% | 5,283 |
| Fulton | 3,136 | 79.61% | 680 | 17.26% | 123 | 3.12% | 2,456 | 62.35% | 3,939 |
| Garland | 22,166 | 67.19% | 9,542 | 28.92% | 1,282 | 3.89% | 12,624 | 38.27% | 32,990 |
| Grant | 5,139 | 81.97% | 922 | 14.71% | 208 | 3.32% | 4,217 | 67.27% | 6,269 |
| Greene | 9,163 | 79.57% | 1,972 | 17.13% | 380 | 3.30% | 7,191 | 62.45% | 11,515 |
| Hempstead | 3,335 | 71.86% | 1,215 | 26.18% | 91 | 1.96% | 2,120 | 45.68% | 4,641 |
| Hot Spring | 7,356 | 74.42% | 2,174 | 21.99% | 355 | 3.59% | 5,182 | 52.42% | 9,885 |
| Howard | 2,608 | 72.06% | 924 | 25.53% | 87 | 2.40% | 1,684 | 46.53% | 3,619 |
| Independence | 8,346 | 79.27% | 1,850 | 17.57% | 332 | 3.15% | 6,496 | 61.70% | 10,528 |
| Izard | 3,691 | 80.78% | 721 | 15.78% | 157 | 3.44% | 2,970 | 65.00% | 4,569 |
| Jackson | 2,932 | 72.95% | 977 | 24.31% | 110 | 2.74% | 1,955 | 48.64% | 4,019 |
| Jefferson | 7,322 | 42.78% | 9,409 | 54.97% | 385 | 2.25% | -2,087 | -12.19% | 17,116 |
| Johnson | 5,133 | 73.61% | 1,536 | 22.03% | 304 | 4.36% | 3,597 | 51.58% | 6,973 |
| Lafayette | 1,294 | 65.92% | 623 | 31.74% | 46 | 2.34% | 671 | 34.18% | 1,963 |
| Lawrence | 3,629 | 79.92% | 733 | 16.14% | 179 | 3.94% | 2,896 | 63.77% | 4,541 |
| Lee | 952 | 47.94% | 981 | 49.40% | 53 | 2.67% | -29 | -1.46% | 1,986 |
| Lincoln | 2,042 | 74.53% | 631 | 23.03% | 67 | 2.45% | 1,411 | 51.50% | 2,740 |
| Little River | 2,895 | 76.39% | 804 | 21.21% | 91 | 2.40% | 2,091 | 55.17% | 3,790 |
| Logan | 4,891 | 78.58% | 1,091 | 17.53% | 242 | 3.89% | 3,800 | 61.05% | 6,224 |
| Lonoke | 16,634 | 74.62% | 4,714 | 21.15% | 944 | 4.23% | 11,920 | 53.47% | 22,292 |
| Madison | 4,274 | 75.54% | 1,188 | 21.00% | 196 | 3.46% | 3,086 | 54.54% | 5,658 |
| Marion | 4,739 | 79.42% | 1,016 | 17.03% | 212 | 3.55% | 3,723 | 62.39% | 5,967 |
| Miller | 8,474 | 75.64% | 2,463 | 21.99% | 266 | 2.37% | 6,011 | 53.66% | 11,203 |
| Mississippi | 5,251 | 62.13% | 2,925 | 34.61% | 275 | 3.25% | 2,326 | 27.52% | 8,451 |
| Monroe | 1,263 | 56.82% | 918 | 41.30% | 42 | 1.89% | 345 | 15.52% | 2,223 |
| Montgomery | 2,382 | 76.67% | 557 | 17.93% | 168 | 5.41% | 1,825 | 58.74% | 3,107 |
| Nevada | 1,697 | 69.21% | 709 | 28.92% | 46 | 1.88% | 988 | 40.29% | 2,452 |
| Newton | 2,447 | 80.26% | 519 | 17.02% | 83 | 2.72% | 1,928 | 63.23% | 3,049 |
| Ouachita | 4,143 | 59.27% | 2,633 | 37.67% | 214 | 3.06% | 1,510 | 21.60% | 6,990 |
| Perry | 2,893 | 76.45% | 738 | 19.50% | 153 | 4.04% | 2,155 | 56.95% | 3,784 |
| Phillips | 1,892 | 44.92% | 2,207 | 52.40% | 113 | 2.68% | -315 | -7.48% | 4,212 |
| Pike | 3,113 | 84.02% | 490 | 13.23% | 102 | 2.75% | 2,623 | 70.80% | 3,705 |
| Poinsett | 4,405 | 79.38% | 1,004 | 18.09% | 140 | 2.52% | 3,401 | 61.29% | 5,549 |
| Polk | 5,607 | 81.51% | 982 | 14.28% | 290 | 4.22% | 4,625 | 67.23% | 6,879 |
| Pope | 12,621 | 73.34% | 3,967 | 23.05% | 622 | 3.61% | 8,654 | 50.28% | 17,210 |
| Prairie | 2,176 | 82.18% | 416 | 15.71% | 56 | 2.11% | 1,760 | 66.47% | 2,648 |
| Pulaski | 49,726 | 40.36% | 68,354 | 55.48% | 5,135 | 4.17% | -18,628 | -15.12% | 123,215 |
| Randolph | 4,245 | 80.58% | 836 | 15.87% | 187 | 3.55% | 3,409 | 64.71% | 5,268 |
| Saline | 30,229 | 70.26% | 11,038 | 25.66% | 1,756 | 4.08% | 19,191 | 44.61% | 43,023 |
| Scott | 2,448 | 83.81% | 360 | 12.32% | 113 | 3.87% | 2,088 | 71.48% | 2,921 |
| Searcy | 2,566 | 81.88% | 440 | 14.04% | 128 | 4.08% | 2,126 | 67.84% | 3,134 |
| Sebastian | 23,023 | 67.44% | 9,590 | 28.09% | 1,526 | 4.47% | 13,433 | 39.35% | 34,139 |
| Sevier | 2,877 | 78.97% | 649 | 17.81% | 117 | 3.21% | 2,228 | 61.16% | 3,643 |
| Sharp | 4,888 | 81.18% | 930 | 15.45% | 203 | 3.37% | 3,958 | 65.74% | 6,021 |
| St. Francis | 2,533 | 50.41% | 2,370 | 47.16% | 122 | 2.43% | 163 | 3.24% | 5,025 |
| Stone | 3,919 | 77.31% | 924 | 18.23% | 226 | 4.46% | 2,995 | 59.08% | 5,069 |
| Union | 7,819 | 67.32% | 3,495 | 30.09% | 300 | 2.58% | 4,324 | 37.23% | 11,614 |
| Van Buren | 4,807 | 77.21% | 1,164 | 18.70% | 255 | 4.10% | 3,643 | 58.51% | 6,226 |
| Washington | 35,201 | 50.09% | 32,497 | 46.24% | 2,584 | 3.68% | 2,704 | 3.85% | 70,282 |
| White | 18,276 | 79.40% | 3,856 | 16.75% | 887 | 3.85% | 14,420 | 62.64% | 23,019 |
| Woodruff | 1,386 | 66.57% | 653 | 31.36% | 43 | 2.07% | 733 | 35.21% | 2,082 |
| Yell | 4,216 | 80.20% | 876 | 16.66% | 165 | 3.14% | 3,340 | 63.53% | 5,257 |
| Totals | 577,316 | 64.21% | 288,631 | 32.10% | 33,163 | 3.69% | 288,685 | 32.11% | 899,110 |

Counties that flipped from Democratic to Republican

- Crittenden (largest city: West Memphis)
- St. Francis (largest city: Forrest City)

==== By congressional district ====
Rutledge won all four congressional districts.

| District | Rutledge | Krout | Representative |
|---|---|---|---|
| 1st | 71% | 25% | Rick Crawford |
| 2nd | 57% | 39% | French Hill |
| 3rd | 61% | 35% | Steve Womack |
| 4th | 69% | 28% | Bruce Westerman |

== See also ==
- 2022 Arkansas elections
