= 2022 Arkansas Attorney General election =

- November 8, 2022
- Turnout: 50.81%
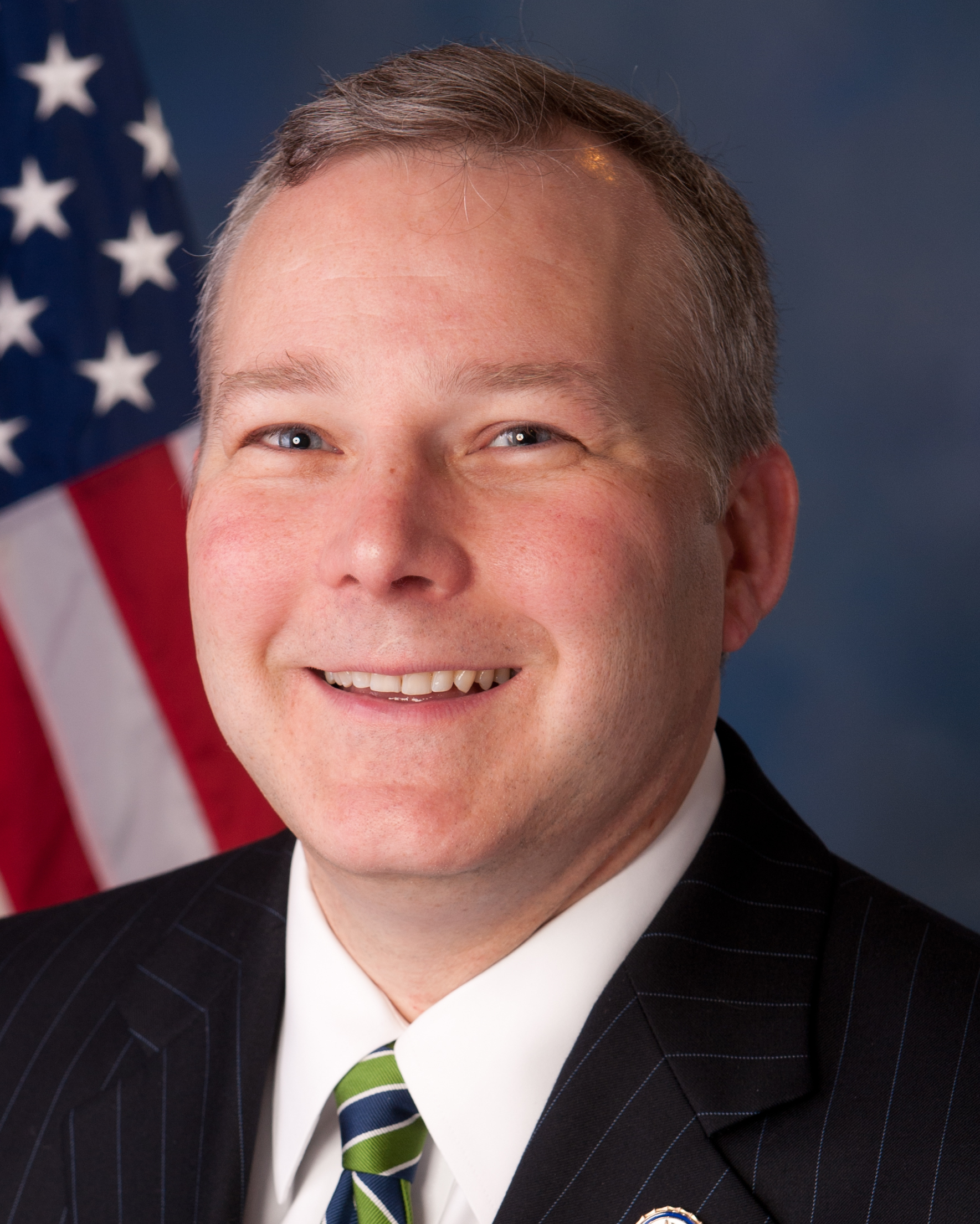

Candidate	Tim Griffin	Jesse Gibson
Party	Republican	Democratic
Popular vote	605,785	290,183
Percentage	67.61%	32.39%
- Griffin: 50–60% 60–70% 70–80% 80–90% Gibson: 50–60%
Attorney General before election
Leslie Rutledge
Republican
Elected Attorney General
Tim Griffin
Republican

The 2022 Arkansas Attorney General election was held on November 8, 2022, to elect the next attorney general of Arkansas. Incumbent Republican Attorney General Leslie Rutledge won re-election on November 6, 2018, to a second term. She was term-limited and had announced a campaign for lieutenant governor of Arkansas in 2022. Primary elections were held on May 24, 2022.

== Republican primary ==
=== Candidates ===
==== Nominee ====
- Tim Griffin, Lieutenant Governor of Arkansas (2015–present), former U.S. Representative from Arkansas's 2nd congressional district (2011–2015), and U.S. Attorney for the Eastern District of Arkansas (2006–2007)

==== Eliminated in primary ====
- Leon Jones Jr., attorney, Director of the Arkansas Department of Labor, (2015–2019) and Director of the Arkansas Fair Housing Commission (2019–2021)

=== Endorsements ===
Tim Griffin

U.S. Executive Branch Officials

- Sarah Sanders, 31st White House Press Secretary (2017–2019) and candidate for Governor of Arkansas in 2022
- Donald Trump, 45th President of the United States (2017–2021)

Statewide officials

- Leslie Rutledge, incumbent Arkansas Attorney General (2015–present) and candidate for Lieutenant Governor of Arkansas in 2022

=== Polling ===
Poll source	Date(s) administered	Sample size (Note: Key: A – all adults RV – registered voters LV – likely voters V – unclear)	Margin of error	Tim Griffin	Leon Jones Jr.	Undecided
Hendrix College	May 2, 2022	802 (LV)	± 4.3%	57%	10%	33%

=== Results ===
Results by county Griffin: 70–80%; 80–90%; 90–100%

Republican primary results
Party	Candidate	Votes	%
Republican	Tim Griffin	286,211	85.38
Republican	Leon Jones Jr.	49,021	14.62
Total votes		355,232	100.00

== Democratic primary ==
=== Candidates ===
==== Nominee ====
- Jesse Gibson, attorney and President of the Arkansas Trial Lawyers Association (2018–2019)

==== Withdrawn ====
- Jason Davis, lawyer

== Independents ==
=== Candidates ===
==== Declared ====
- Gerhard Langguth, former chair of the Libertarian Party of Arkansas (write-in)

== General election ==
=== Debate ===
2022 Arkansas Attorney General debate
No.	Date	Host	Moderator	Link	Republican	Democratic
Key: P Participant A Absent N Not invited I Invited W Withdrawn						
Key: P Participant A Absent N Not invited I Invited W Withdrawn					Tim Griffin	Jesse Gibson
1	Oct. 19, 2022	University of Central Arkansas; Arkansas PBS	Steve Barnes		P	P

=== Predictions ===
Source	Ranking	As of
Sabato's Crystal Ball	Safe R	September 14, 2022
Elections Daily	Safe R	November 1, 2022

=== Polling ===
Poll source	Date(s) administered	Sample size	Margin of error	Tim Griffin (R)	Jesse Gibson (D)	Undecided
Hendrix College	September 12, 2022	835 (LV)	± 3.8%	49%	32%	19%
Remington Research Group (R) (Note: This poll was sponsored by Griffin's campaign)	July 18–20, 2022	1,008 (LV)	± 3.1%	65%	29%	6%

=== Results ===
2022 Arkansas Attorney General election
Party	Candidate	Votes	%	±%
Republican	Tim Griffin	605,785	67.61	+5.81
Democratic	Jesse Gibson	290,183	32.39	−3.04
Total votes		895,968	100.00	N/A
Republican hold				

==== By county ====
County	Tim Griffin Republican		Jesse Gibson Democratic		Margin		Total
County	#	%	#	%	#	%	Total
Arkansas	3,398	76.36%	1,052	23.64%	2,346	52.72%	4,450
Ashley	4,145	76.26%	1,290	23.74%	2,855	52.53%	5,435
Baxter	12,410	79.74%	3,154	20.26%	9,256	59.47%	15,564
Benton	60,154	66.81%	29,881	33.19%	30,273	33.62%	90,035
Boone	10,261	81.38%	2,347	18.62%	7,914	62.77%	12,608
Bradley	1,794	69.81%	776	30.19%	1,018	39.61%	2,570
Calhoun	1,284	81.06%	300	18.94%	984	62.12%	1,584
Carroll	6,020	66.87%	2,982	33.13%	3,038	33.75%	9,002
Chicot	1,611	47.85%	1,756	52.15%	-145	-4.31%	3,367
Clark	3,783	62.16%	2,303	37.84%	1,480	24.32%	6,086
Clay	3,169	81.07%	740	18.93%	2,429	62.14%	3,909
Cleburne	8,564	85.75%	1,423	14.25%	7,141	71.50%	9,987
Cleveland	2,405	85.98%	392	14.02%	2,013	71.97%	2,797
Columbia	4,235	70.01%	1,814	29.99%	2,421	40.02%	6,049
Conway	4,729	70.58%	1,971	29.42%	2,758	41.16%	6,700
Craighead	19,444	70.81%	8,014	29.19%	11,430	41.63%	27,458
Crawford	13,676	80.88%	3,232	19.12%	10,444	61.77%	16,908
Crittenden	5,418	51.11%	5,182	48.89%	236	2.23%	10,600
Cross	3,807	77.71%	1,092	22.29%	2,715	55.42%	4,899
Dallas	1,395	67.92%	659	32.08%	736	35.83%	2,054
Desha	1,668	55.43%	1,341	44.57%	327	10.87%	3,009
Drew	3,465	66.24%	1,766	33.76%	1,699	32.48%	5,231
Faulkner	27,259	68.55%	12,505	31.45%	14,754	37.10%	39,764
Franklin	4,333	80.79%	1,030	19.21%	3,303	61.59%	5,363
Fulton	3,168	80.32%	776	19.68%	2,392	60.65%	3,944
Garland	23,212	70.74%	9,601	29.26%	13,611	41.48%	32,813
Grant	5,369	85.55%	907	14.45%	4,462	71.10%	6,276
Greene	9,341	81.43%	2,130	18.57%	7,211	62.86%	11,471
Hempstead	3,396	73.38%	1,232	26.62%	2,164	46.76%	4,628
Hot Spring	7,505	76.98%	2,244	23.02%	5,261	53.96%	9,749
Howard	2,708	74.95%	905	25.05%	1,803	49.90%	3,613
Independence	8,535	81.47%	1,941	18.53%	6,594	62.94%	10,476
Izard	3,784	83.20%	764	16.80%	3,020	66.40%	4,548
Jackson	3,001	74.89%	1,006	25.11%	1,995	49.79%	4,007
Jefferson	7,654	44.65%	9,489	55.35%	-1,835	-10.70%	17,143
Johnson	5,342	76.76%	1,617	23.24%	3,725	53.53%	6,959
Lafayette	1,304	67.04%	641	32.96%	663	34.09%	1,945
Lawrence	3,769	82.49%	800	17.51%	2,969	64.98%	4,569
Lee	994	50.03%	993	49.97%	1	0.05%	1,987
Lincoln	2,061	75.49%	669	24.51%	1,392	50.99%	2,730
Little River	2,953	78.20%	823	21.80%	2,130	56.41%	3,776
Logan	5,027	81.02%	1,178	18.98%	3,849	62.03%	6,205
Lonoke	17,572	78.87%	4,708	21.13%	12,864	57.74%	22,280
Madison	4,420	78.65%	1,200	21.35%	3,220	57.30%	5,620
Marion	4,819	81.01%	1,130	18.99%	3,689	62.01%	5,949
Miller	8,637	77.36%	2,528	22.64%	6,109	54.72%	11,165
Mississippi	5,497	64.62%	3,009	35.38%	2,488	29.25%	8,506
Monroe	1,297	58.58%	917	41.42%	380	17.16%	2,214
Montgomery	2,476	81.61%	558	18.39%	1,918	63.22%	3,034
Nevada	1,689	69.08%	756	30.92%	933	38.16%	2,445
Newton	2,462	80.91%	581	19.09%	1,881	61.81%	3,043
Ouachita	4,252	61.08%	2,709	38.92%	1,543	22.17%	6,961
Perry	3,005	79.56%	772	20.44%	2,233	59.12%	3,777
Phillips	1,948	46.17%	2,271	53.83%	-323	-7.66%	4,219
Pike	3,184	86.43%	500	13.57%	2,684	72.86%	3,684
Poinsett	4,431	80.36%	1,083	19.64%	3,348	60.72%	5,514
Polk	5,850	85.48%	994	14.52%	4,856	70.95%	6,844
Pope	13,438	78.42%	3,697	21.58%	9,741	56.85%	17,135
Prairie	2,245	84.27%	419	15.73%	1,826	68.54%	2,664
Pulaski	54,948	44.71%	67,942	55.29%	-12,994	-10.57%	122,890
Randolph	4,335	82.18%	940	17.82%	3,395	64.36%	5,275
Saline	31,979	74.46%	10,968	25.54%	21,011	48.92%	42,947
Scott	2,519	86.33%	399	13.67%	2,120	72.65%	2,918
Searcy	2,669	85.46%	454	14.54%	2,215	70.93%	3,123
Sebastian	24,226	71.35%	9,729	28.65%	14,497	42.69%	33,955
Sevier	2,949	81.28%	679	18.72%	2,270	62.57%	3,628
Sharp	5,001	83.39%	996	16.61%	4,005	66.78%	5,997
St. Francis	2,555	50.89%	2,466	49.11%	89	1.77%	5,021
Stone	4,039	80.04%	1,007	19.96%	3,032	60.09%	5,046
Union	8,008	69.17%	3,570	30.83%	4,438	38.33%	11,578
Van Buren	5,025	81.38%	1,150	18.62%	3,875	62.75%	6,175
Washington	38,016	54.42%	31,842	45.58%	6,174	8.84%	69,858
White	18,958	82.72%	3,959	17.28%	14,999	65.45%	22,917
Woodruff	1,411	68.23%	657	31.77%	754	36.46%	2,068
Yell	4,375	83.33%	875	16.67%	3,500	66.67%	5,250
Totals	605,785	67.61%	290,183	32.39%	315,602	35.22%	895,968

Counties that flipped from Democratic to Republican

- Crittenden (largest city: West Memphis)
- Lee (largest city: Marianna)
- St. Francis (largest city: Forrest City)

==== By congressional district ====
Griffin won all four congressional districts.

District	Griffin	Gibson	Representative
1st	74%	26%	Rick Crawford
2nd	62%	38%	French Hill
3rd	65%	35%	Steve Womack
4th	72%	28%	Bruce Westerman

== See also ==
- 2022 United States attorney general elections
- 2022 Arkansas elections

== Notes ==
Partisan clients
