= Speaking for Myself =

2020 book by Sarah Sanders

Speaking for Myself: Faith, Freedom, and the Fight of Our Lives Inside the Trump White House
- First edition (publ. St. Martin's Press)
- Author: Sarah Saunders
- Language: English
- Subject: Politics
- Genre: Non-fiction
- Publisher: St. Martin's Press
- Publication date: 21 September 2021
- Publication place: United States
- ISBN: 9781250817136

Speaking for Myself: Faith, Freedom, and the Fight of Our Lives Inside the Trump White House is a 2020 book by Sarah Sanders.
