= Joseph K. Wood =

American politician

Joseph Wood
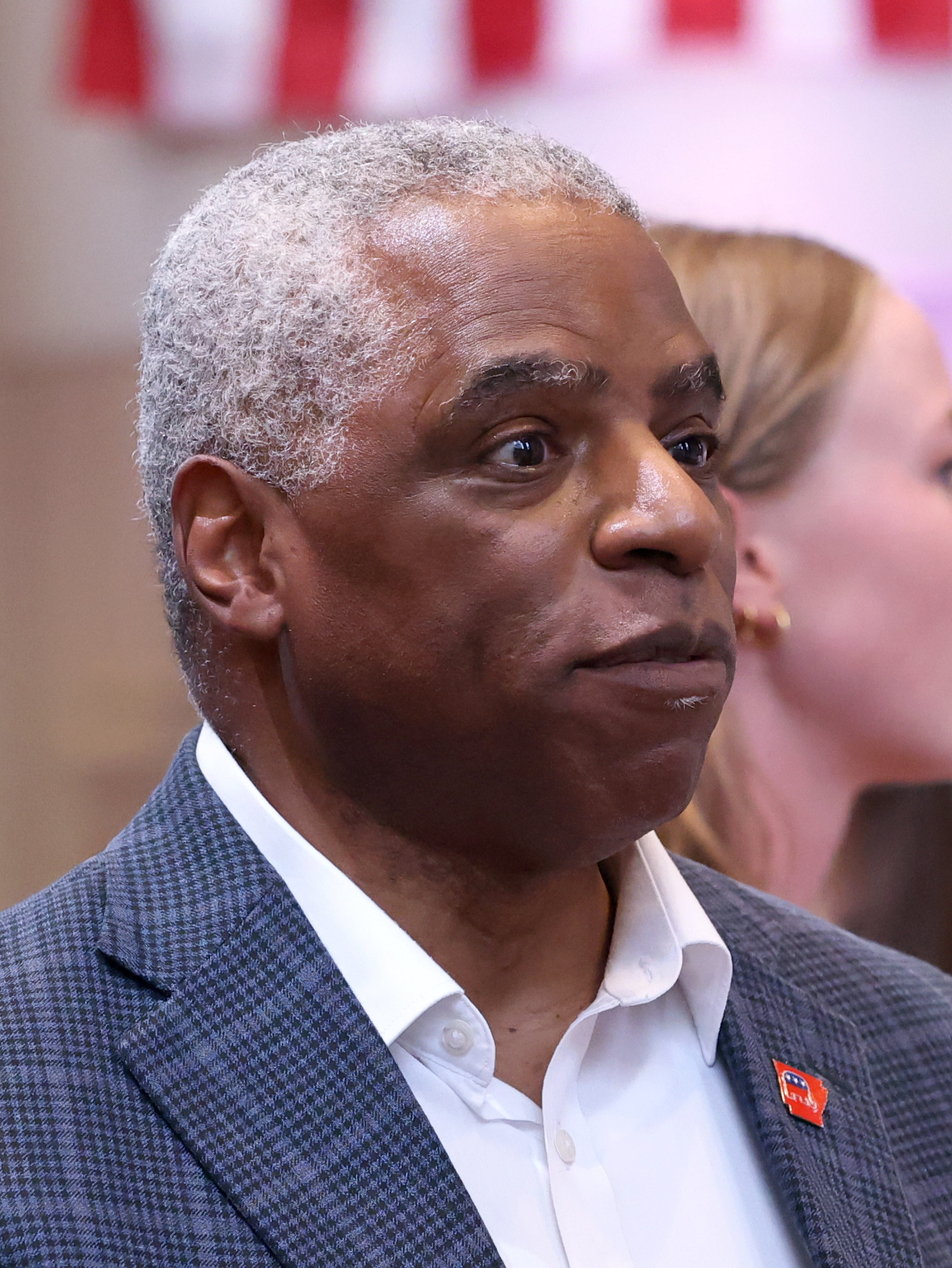
- Wood in 2026

Chair of the Arkansas Republican Party
- Incumbent
- Assumed office August 19, 2023
- Preceded by: Cody Hiland

Secretary of Transformation and Shared Services of Arkansas
- In office January 2023 – September 2023
- Governor: Sarah Huckabee Sanders
- Preceded by: Mitch Rouse
- Succeeded by: Aide Fisken

Personal details
- Born: Chicago, Illinois, U.S.
- Party: Republican
- Spouse: June
- Children: 3
- Education: Iowa State University (BA); National Louis University (attended); Ecclesia College (MA)

Joseph K. Wood is an American judge and politician serving as the chair of the Arkansas Republican Party since August 2023. He previously served as Secretary of Transformation & Shared Services in Governor Sarah Huckabee Sanders' cabinet in 2023. He served two terms as Washington County judge, being elected in 2016 and reelected in 2018.

== Early life and education ==
Joseph Wood was born in Chicago. He was abandoned as a newborn and lived in an orphanage until his adoption. He is the author of a book series about a child who is adopted. He graduated from Iowa State University in 1987 and Ecclesia College in 2016.

== Political career ==
In 2008, Wood lost a campaign to be state party chair of the Arkansas Republican Party to Doyle Webb. He was elected Washington County judge in 2016 and reelected in 2018. He was the first Black judge elected in Arkansas. He lost the Republican primary in the 2022 Arkansas lieutenant gubernatorial election, placing fourth with 8.60% of the vote. During the campaign, he describes himself as a Conservative Republican.

In January 2023, he was appointed Secretary of Transformation & Shared Services in Governor Sarah Huckabee Sanders' cabinet. In August 2023, he was elected chairman of the Arkansas Republican Party. He was replaced in Huckabee's cabinet by Aide Fisken in September 2023. In June 2024, Wood was replaced as chairman of the Arkansas Republican Party convention for a day by Saline County attorney Jennifer Lancaster in a rejection of party leadership. Wood served as a presidential elector for the 3rd congressional district, pledged to vote for Donald Trump. In 2025 Wood was appointed to the seven-member Black History Commission of Arkansas; his term ends in 2026.

Party political offices
Preceded by Cody Hiland	Chair of the Arkansas Republican Party; 2023–present	Incumbent
