= Frank Tsamoutales =

- Born: May 1, 1960 (age 66)
- Occupations: Businessman, lobbyist

Frank Tsamoutales (born May 1, 1960) is an American lobbyist and business consultant from Florida. He is the President, Chairman, and CEO of Tsamoutales Strategies.

== Education ==
Tsamoutales graduated from Melbourne Central Catholic High School in 1978, and earned a BS from Florida State University in 1982, concentrating in Government and Communications.

== Career ==
Tsamoutales was a campus coordinator for George Bush's 1980 campaign at Florida State University in Tallahassee. He was a Co-Chairman of the National Finance Committee for the presidential campaigns of Ronald Reagan, George H. W. Bush, and Mike Huckabee. He also held leadership positions on the finance committee for all three of Jeb Bush's Florida Governor campaigns, Bob Martinez's Florida Governor Campaign, Tom Gallahager's for Florida Governor Campaign, Marco Rubio for US Senate, Bill Posey for US Congress and Daniel Webster for US Congress campaigns, as well as the Mike Haridopolos for the Florida House and Florida Senate campaigns.

Tsamoutales served on the RTCA special committee responsible for the establishment of aviation-related security standards. Appointed by two Governors, he served on the East Central Florida Regional Planning Council, the Technological Research and Development Authority and the former Florida Department of Commerce Economic Development Commission. He was also named one of the 100 most powerful people on the nations space coast.

Tsamoutales was the only non-Polish advisor to Lech Wałęsa's successful campaign for President of Poland in 1990. He served as Chairman of HuckPac, a national political action committee chaired by Mike Huckabee in 2010.

Internationally, he has represented US corporations and negotiated on their behalf privatization agreements in the aviation, transportation, and maritime industries in Poland, then-East Germany, the Netherlands, and Hungary. Domestically, Tsamoutales has worked with ABM Industries, BJ's Wholesale Club, Honeywell International, Inc., Kamylon Holdings, KTA-Tator, Inc., SitelogIQ, Inc., Tensor Engineering and Transformative Healthcare before federal, state and local government as well as leading business development.

== Personal life ==
Tsamoutales married Kimberly Hill, daughter of former Orlando Magic Coach Brian Hill. His wife has cystic fibrosis and is active in supporting related causes and foundations.
