= Betty Overbey =

American politician

Member of the Arkansas House of Representatives from the 69th district
- In office January 2011 – January 2017
- Preceded by: George Overbey
- Succeeded by: Aaron Pilkington

Personal details
- Born: January 9, 1946 (age 80) ns
- Party: Democratic
- Spouse: George Overbey

Betty Overbey (born January 9, 1946) is an American politician and a Democratic former member of the Arkansas House of Representatives for District 69 from January 2011 to January 2017. Overbey's husband, George Overbey, held the seat from 2005 until 2011. The district encompasses Johnson and Pope counties in northwestern Arkansas.

== Elections ==
- 2010 When District 69 Representative George Overbey left the legislature, Mrs. Overbey placed first in the three-way Democratic primary election held on May 18. She polled 2,218 votes (46.2 percent). She then won the June 8 runoff election with 1,812 votes (50.4 percent) and was unopposed in the 2010 general election.
- 2012 Overbey was unopposed for the May 22, 2012 Democratic primary and won the November 6, 2012 general election with 4,770 votes (50.8 percent) against Republican nominee Dwight Hoyle, who in 2010 had been a Democratic primary candidate and Overbey's runoff opponent.
- 2016 Overbey was unseated in the general election held on November 8, 2016, by the young Republican Aaron Pilkington, a health care administrator from Clarksville in Johnson County.
