= Technological Research and Development Authority =

Independent Special District of the state of Florida

Technological Research and Development Authority (TRDA) was an Independent Special District of the state of Florida. As a technology-based economic development organization it focuses upon the incubation of new business ventures, the acceleration of growth of existing firms and the commercialization of innovative technologies.

In June 2013, Florida Governor Rick Scott signed into law House Bill 1013 which dissolved the TRDA on December 31, 2013 after a scandal.

== SBIR Grant Program and the DoD ==
The largest source of financing in the early stages of technology development in the U.S. is the Small Business Innovation Research (SBIR) grant program, totaling more than $2 billion every year. The U.S. Department of Defense (DoD) awards more than $1 billion a year through its [SBIR] grant program.

The SBIR grant program supports small early-stage, research and development (R&D) technology companies in order to increase private sector commercialization of and small business participation in federally funded R&D. The program also stimulates technological innovation and fosters minority and disadvantaged firms participation in technological innovation.

The SBIR program has three phases (I, II and III) in which Phase I is project feasibility, Phase II is project development to prototype and Phase III is commercialization.

== Commercialization Assistance Program Overview ==
The TRDA Commercialization Assistance Program (CAP) is designed to create technology-based economic development by bringing together the government and private industries to successfully launch new product innovations into the marketplace, create high-wage jobs and further grow a technically skilled workforce. TRDA collaborates with the Greater Syracuse Chamber of Commerce to mirror the Florida activities in New York.

TRDA aids the Department of Defense by supporting companies in Phase II of the SBIR grant process in order to transition to Phase III — thus achieving full commercialization and providing a positive return on the SBIR investment. TRDA identifies the most promising Department of Defense SBIR Phase II technologies to support and provides them with guidance and mentoring in the areas of business planning, marketing, sales, government contracting and capital acquisition. TRDA also creates connections from the companies to Department of Defense acquisition managers, prime contractors and private corporations. Also offered is the opportunity to share their product information with audiences of potential investors and strategic partners at public forums.

== Commercialization Assistance Program Participants ==
Accelogic (Weston, FL); Advance Magnet Lab, Inc. (Palm Bay, FL); Aerotonomy (Ft. Oglethorpe, GA); AERONIX, Inc. (Melbourne, FL); AET, Inc. (Melbourne, FL); APECOR (Orlando, FL); Benedict Engineering Co., Inc. (Tallahassee, FL); CANVS Corp. (Coral Gables, FL); Cesaroni Technology, Inc. (Sarasota, FL); CFD Research Corp. (Huntsville, AL); Circular Logic (Boca Raton, Florida); Digital Authentication Technologies, Inc. (Boca Raton, Florida); Engineering Acoustics, Inc. (Casselberry, FL); Mainstream Engineering Corp. (Rockledge, FL); MtronPTI (Orlando, FL); NanoEngineering Corp. (Wellington, FL); Novel Engineering Solutions, Inc. (Ft. Walton Beach, FL); Photon-X (Huntsville, AL); RINI Technologies, Inc. (Orlando, FL); Securboration (Melbourne, FL); The Athena Group, Inc. (Gainesville, FL); Transgenex Nanobiotech, Inc. (Tampa, FL).
