= Aaron Pilkington =

American politician from Arkansas

The Honourable Aaron Pilkington
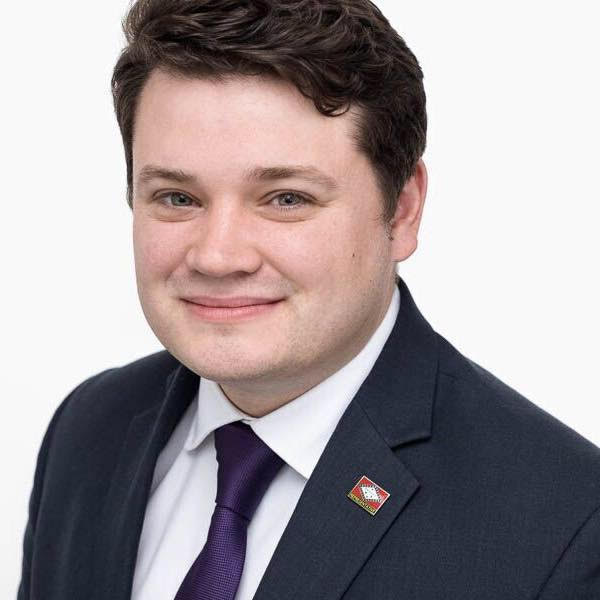

Member of the Arkansas House of Representatives from the 45th district
- Incumbent
- Assumed office 2017
- Preceded by: Betty Overbey

Personal details
- Born: 1990 (age 35–36) Fort Smith, Arkansas, U.S.
- Party: Republican
- Spouse: Emmaline Pilkington
- Children: 4
- Education: Washington & Jefferson College; University of Arkansas for Medical Sciences
- Occupation: Health care administrator

Aaron Michel Pilkington (born 1990) is the Republican state representative for District 45, which includes portions of Johnson and Pope counties in northwestern Arkansas.

Pilkington is a graduate of Fairmont Senior High School in Fairmont, West Virginia, where he was elected class President. He obtained his undergraduate education at Washington & Jefferson College in Washington, Pennsylvania, where he was a member of the fraternity Delta Tau Delta. He also attended the University of Arkansas for Medical Sciences and graduated with a master's degree in health care administration. Pilkington serves on two House committees: (1) Public Health, Welfare, and Labor and (2) House City, County, and Local Affairs Committee. He resides in Clarksville in Johnson County.

First elected in 2016, when he unseated the Democratic Representative Betty Overbey, Pilkington won reelection to his second legislative term in the general election held on November 6, 2018. With 5,034 votes (58.4 percent), he defeated another Democrat, Eddie King, who polled 3,595 votes (41.6 percent). Pilkington ran unopposed in the 2020 and 2022 elections. In 2024 he defeated Democrat Whitney Freeman with 78% of the vote to her 21%.

In the 2024 Republican Party presidential primary, Pilkington has endorsed Florida Governor Ron DeSantis.

In 2025 Pilkington sponsored the Healthy Moms Healthy Babies ACT, in order to address Arkansas’s maternal health crisis.
