= Jay Martin (lawyer) =

American attorney and politician (born 1969)

Majority Leader of the Arkansas House of Representatives
- In office January 2005 – January 2007
- Preceded by: Harmon Seawel
- Succeeded by: Steve Harrelson

Member of the Arkansas House of Representatives from the 40th district
- In office January 2003 – January 2007
- Preceded by: Shawn Womack
- Succeeded by: Barry Hyde

Personal details
- Born: October 8, 1969 (age 56) Little Rock, Arkansas, U.S.
- Party: Democratic
- Spouse: Dawn
- Children: 3
- Education: University of Arkansas (BA, JD)

Jay C. Martin (born October 8, 1969) is an American attorney and politician who served as a member of the Arkansas House of Representatives for the 40th district from 2003 to 2007. In 2005, Martin served as majority leader of the House.

== Early life and education ==
Martin was born in Little Rock, Arkansas in 1969. Martin had a mentally ill father and was raised in North Little Rock. In 1992, he earned a Bachelor of Arts degree from the University of Arkansas at Little Rock. Four years later, Martin earned Juris Doctor from the University of Arkansas School of Law.

== Career ==
Since 1997, Martin has worked as an attorney at James R. Wallace and Associates. He was elected to the Arkansas House of Representatives in November 2002 and assumed office in January 2003. He left office in 2007. Martin serves as the president of Wallace, Martin Duke & Russell.

=== 2022 Arkansas gubernatorial election ===
On February 8, 2022, Martin announced that he would run for governor of Arkansas in the 2022 Arkansas gubernatorial election. Martin campaigned as a pro-life Democrat. He lost a primary to Chris Jones. In 2024, he sought the position of Chief Justice in the nonpartisan judicial primary, but was eliminated in the first primary.

== Personal life ==
Martin and his wife, Dawn, have three children. He is an ordained minister of the Assemblies of God.
