= 2022 Arkansas elections =

A general election was held in the U.S. state of Arkansas on November 8, 2022. All of Arkansas' executive officers were up for election as well as all four of the state's seats in the United States House of Representatives and a U.S. senator. Primaries were held on May 24, 2022, with runoff primaries on June 21. Polls were open from 7:30 AM to 7:30 PM CST.

== Governor ==
Incumbent Republican governor Asa Hutchinson was term-limited and not eligible for re-election. Two Republicans and five Democrats were qualified to be major party candidates. Following the primary elections, Republican Sarah Sanders faced Democrat Chris Jones in the general election.

== Lieutenant governor ==
The incumbent lieutenant governor was term-limited and instead ran for attorney general. Two Democrats, six Republicans, and a Libertarian ran for lieutenant governor. In November 2021, retiring attorney general Leslie Rutledge withdrew from the governor's race and ran for lieutenant governor instead. Rutledge won the Republican primary and easily defeated Democrat Kelly Krout in the general election.

== Secretary of state ==
Incumbent secretary John Thurston ran for re-election. Originally facing two other Republicans and two Democrats, Thurston won the Republican primary and defeated Democratic candidate Anna Beth Gorman in the general election.

== Attorney general ==
Incumbent attorney general Leslie Rutledge was term-limited and not eligible for re-election, and instead ran for lieutenant governor. Incumbent lieutenant governor Tim Griffin won the Republican primary on May 24 and defeated Democrat Jesse Gibson in the general election.

== State treasurer ==
Incumbent treasurer Dennis Milligan was term-limited and not eligible for re-election, and instead ran for state auditor. In February 2021, Republican Mathew Pitsch declared his candidacy for treasurer of Arkansas in the 2022 election, though lost his party primary to Arkansas House representative Mark Lowery. Lowery defeated Democratic candidate Pam Whitaker in the general election.

== State auditor ==
Incumbent auditor Andrea Lea was term-limited and unable to run for re-election. Term-limited state treasurer Dennis Milligan entered the race as the Republican candidate and won against Democratic candidate Diamond Arnold-Johnson and Libertarian Simeon Snow.

== Commissioner of state lands ==
Incumbent land commissioner Tommy Land ran for re-election and defeated Democratic candidate Darlene Gaines in the general election.

== Federal offices ==
=== United States Senate ===
Incumbent senator John Boozman ran for a third term, easily defeating Democratic challenger Natalie James.

=== United States House of Representatives ===
Arkansas has four seats in the United States House of Representatives. All four incumbent Republicans comfortably won reelection.

== Supreme Court ==
Three seats on the Arkansas Supreme Court were up for election in 2022, two of which were contested. Justice Rhonda Wood won reelection unopposed.

=== Associate Justice (Position 2) ===
Incumbent Justice Robin Wynne won reelection to a second term.

==== Candidates ====
- Robin Wynne, incumbent
- Chris Carnahan, district court judge
- David Sterling, attorney

==== General election ====
Results by county Wynne: 30–40%; 40–50%; 50–60%; 60–70%; Carnahan: 30–40%; 40–50%; 50–60%

2022 Arkansas Supreme Court Associate Justice Position 2 election
Party	Candidate	Votes	%
Nonpartisan	Robin Wynne (incumbent)	202,815	49.51%
Nonpartisan	Chris Carnahan	117,859	28.77%
Nonpartisan	David Sterling	88,938	21.71%
Total votes		409,612	100%

==== Runoff ====
Runoff results by county Wynne: 50–60%; 60–70%; 70–80%; Carnahan: 50–60%; 60–70%

2022 Arkansas Supreme Court Associate Justice Position 2 runoff election
Party	Candidate	Votes	%
Nonpartisan	Robin Wynne (incumbent)	450,094	58.36%
Nonpartisan	Chris Carnahan	321,123	41.64%
Total votes		771,217	100%

=== Associate Justice (Position 6) ===
Incumbent Justice Karen Baker won reelection to a third term.

==== Candidates ====
- Karen Baker, incumbent
- Gunner DeLay, circuit court judge

==== General election ====
Results by county Baker: 50–60%; 60–70%; 70–80%; DeLay: 50–60%

2022 Arkansas Supreme Court Associate Justice Position 6 election
Party	Candidate	Votes	%
Nonpartisan	Karen Baker (incumbent)	262,043	63.99%
Nonpartisan	Gunner DeLay	147,481	36.01%
Total votes		409,524	100%

== General Assembly ==
=== State Senate ===
All 35 seats in the Arkansas Senate were up for election.

=== State House of Representatives ===
All 100 seats in the Arkansas House of Representatives were up for election.

== Ballot measures ==
Four statewide measures appeared on the ballot in 2022, all of which failed.

2022 Arkansas ballot measures
Name	Description	Votes				Type
Name	Description	Yes	%	No	%	Type
Issue 1	Provides the legislature the authority to call itself into an extraordinary session, instead of the governor.	335,569	39.10	522,693	60.90	Legislatively referred constitutional amendment
Issue 2	Establish a 60% vote threshold to approve ballot initiatives instead of a simple majority.	353,815	40.88	511,580	59.12	Legislatively referred constitutional amendment
Issue 3	Provides that the state government "shall not burden a person's freedom of religion even if the burden results from a rule of general applicability".	433,475	49.59	440,687	50.41	Legislatively referred constitutional amendment
Issue 4	Legalizes recreational marijuana for people over 21 years old and enacts a tax on marijuana sales.	392,940	43.75	505,130	56.25	Citizen initiated constitutional amendment
Source: Arkansas Secretary of State

Results by county

Issue 1 results by county
Yes:
- 50–60%
No:
- 50–60%
- 60–70%
- 70–80%

Issue 2 results by county
Yes:
- 50–60%
No:
- 50–60%
- 60–70%

Issue 3 results by county
Yes:
- 50–60%
- 60–70%
No:
- 50–60%

Issue 4 results by county
Yes:
- 50–60%
No:
- 50–60%
- 60–70%
