= Sarah Huckabee Sanders =

Governor of Arkansas since 2023

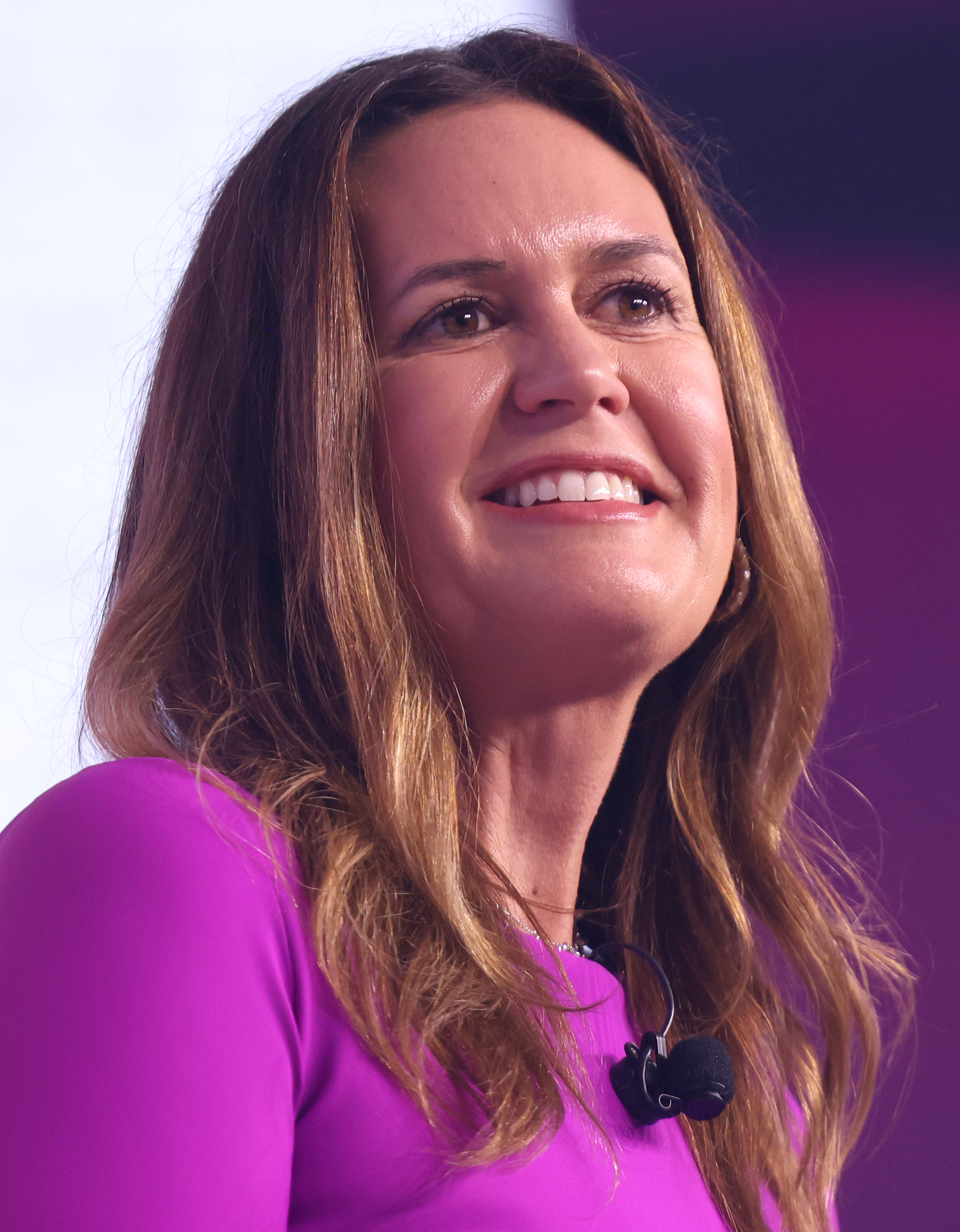
- Sanders in 2026

47th Governor of Arkansas
- Incumbent
- Assumed office January 10, 2023
- Lieutenant: Leslie Rutledge
- Preceded by: Asa Hutchinson

31st White House Press Secretary
- In office July 21, 2017 – July 1, 2019
- President: Donald Trump
- Deputy: Raj Shah; Hogan Gidley
- Preceded by: Sean Spicer
- Succeeded by: Stephanie Grisham

White House Deputy Press Secretary
- In office January 20, 2017 – July 26, 2017
- President: Donald Trump
- Preceded by: Eric Schultz
- Succeeded by: Raj Shah

Personal details
- Born: Sarah Elizabeth Huckabee; August 13, 1982 (age 44) Little Rock, Arkansas, U.S.
- Party: Republican
- Spouse: Bryan Sanders (m. 2010)
- Children: 3
- Parents: Mike Huckabee (father); Janet Huckabee (mother)
- Education: Ouachita Baptist University (BA)
- Website: Office website Campaign website
- Sanders's voice Sanders commenting on the Tree of Life synagogue shooting. Recorded October 29, 2018

Sarah Elizabeth Huckabee Sanders (née Huckabee; born August 13, 1982) is an American politician serving as the 47th governor of Arkansas since 2023. Sanders is the daughter of Ambassador Mike Huckabee, who was the 44th governor of Arkansas. A member of the Republican Party, she joined Donald Trump's 2016 presidential campaign, then served as 31st White House press secretary from 2017 to 2019, the third woman in the role.

As press secretary during the first Trump presidency, Sanders had a confrontational relationship with the White House press corps over a range of Trump policy decisions. When interviewed by investigators as part of the Mueller probe, she admitted making false statements in her role. Sanders hosted fewer press conferences than any of the 13 previous White House press secretaries.

In June 2019, Trump tweeted that Sanders would be leaving her role as press secretary. On January 25, 2021, she announced her candidacy for governor of Arkansas; Trump endorsed her. She secured the Republican nomination in May 2022; her general election opponents were the Democratic nominee, Chris Jones, and the Libertarian nominee, Ricky Dale Harrington. Sanders won the gubernatorial election, defeating Democratic nominee Chris Jones. She is the first female governor of Arkansas, the first woman to be governor of a state of which her father was also governor, and the youngest current governor. Sanders was reelected in 2026.

Sanders has been recognized in Fortune and Time magazine's "40 under 40". She wrote the The New York Times bestseller Speaking for Myself, is a former Fox News Channel contributor, and served on the Fulbright board.

== Early life and education ==
Sarah Elizabeth Huckabee was born on August 13, 1982, in Little Rock, Arkansas. She is the youngest child and only daughter of Mike Huckabee and Janet Huckabee (née McCain), both politicians. She has two brothers, John Mark Huckabee and David Huckabee. After graduating from Little Rock Central High School in Little Rock, Arkansas, Huckabee attended Ouachita Baptist University (her father's alma mater) in Arkadelphia, Arkansas. She was elected student body president of the university and was active in Republican organizations. In 2004, she graduated from the university with a Bachelor of Arts degree, majoring in political science and minoring in mass communications.

== Early political career ==
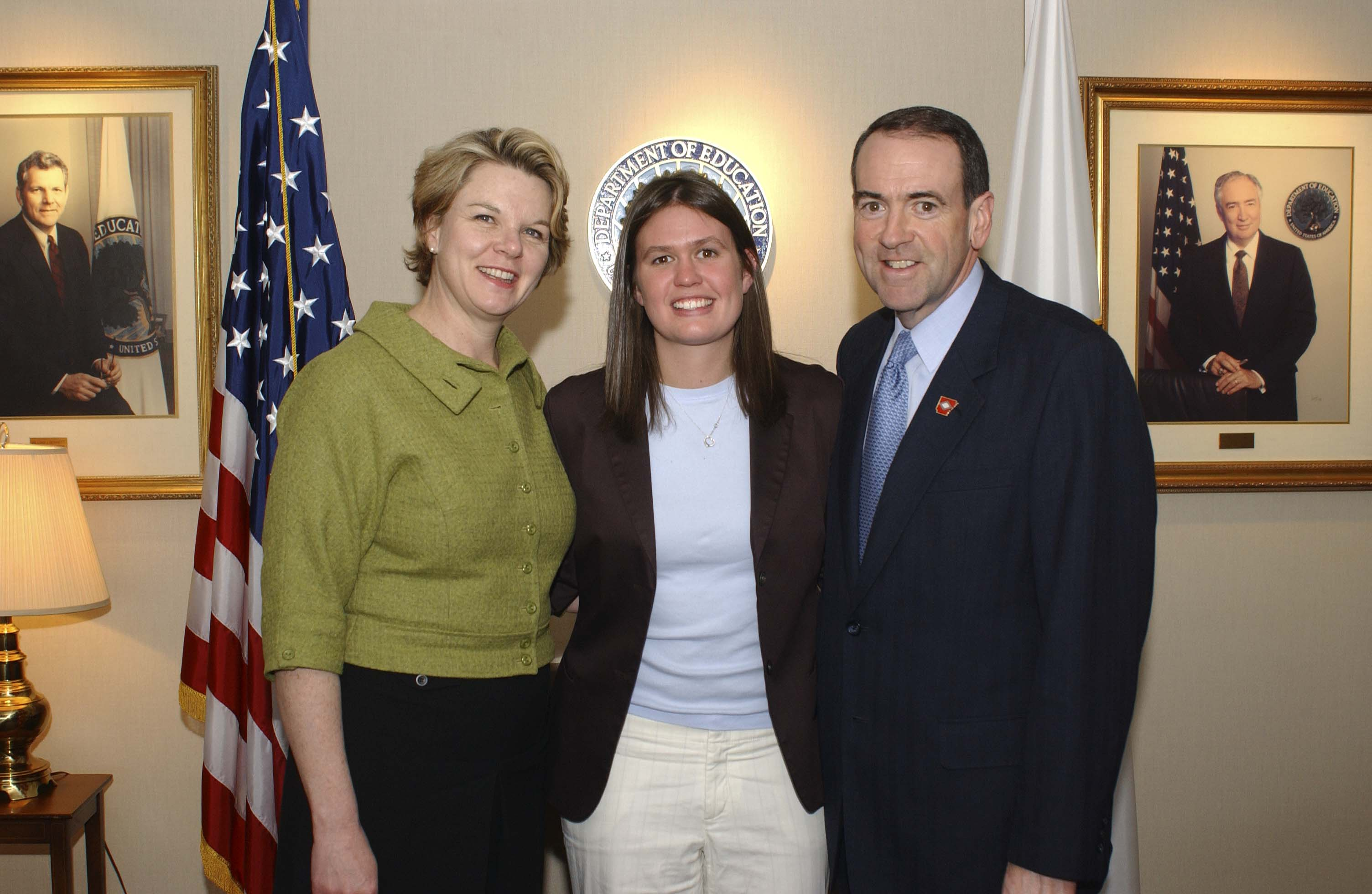
Huckabee Sanders, center, and her father Mike Huckabee with U.S. Secretary of Education Margaret Spellings in 2005

Before entering politics as a candidate, Sanders served as a political consultant and a campaign insider. She was involved in her father's first campaign for the United States Senate in 1992. Describing the unsuccessful bid in an interview for The Hill, she said: "He didn't really have much of a staff, so our family has been very engaged and very supportive of my dad. I was stuffing envelopes, I was knocking on doors, I was putting up yard signs." Her father said of her childhood, "I always say that when most kids are seven or eight years old out jumping rope, she was sitting at the kitchen table listening to political commentators analyze poll results." Huckabee said that he and his wife spoiled Sarah at times. He called her "doggone tough" and "fearless" due to having grown up with two brothers. Sanders was a field coordinator for her father's 2002 reelection campaign for governor of Arkansas. She was a regional liaison for congressional affairs at the U.S. Department of Education under President George W. Bush, and worked as a field coordinator for Bush's reelection campaign in Ohio in 2004.

Sanders was a founding partner of Second Street Strategies in Little Rock, a general consulting services provider for Republican campaigns. She worked on national political campaigns and campaigns for federal office in Arkansas. Sanders was also vice president of Tsamoutales Strategies. She was national political director for her father's 2008 presidential campaign. After her father's 2008 campaign, she worked as executive director of Huck PAC, a political action committee. She was also a senior adviser to Tim Pawlenty in his 2012 presidential run. Sanders was involved in the campaigns of both U.S. senators from Arkansas, managing John Boozman's 2010 campaign and serving as a senior adviser to Tom Cotton's 2014 campaign.

In 2010, Sanders was named one of Time magazine's "40 under 40" in politics. She served for a period as the national campaign manager for the ONE Campaign, a global nonprofit founded by Irish musician Bono aimed at ending global poverty and preventable diseases. In 2016, after managing her father's presidential campaign, Sanders signed on as a senior adviser for Donald Trump's 2016 presidential campaign and ran its communications for coalitions.

== Trump administration (2017–2019) ==
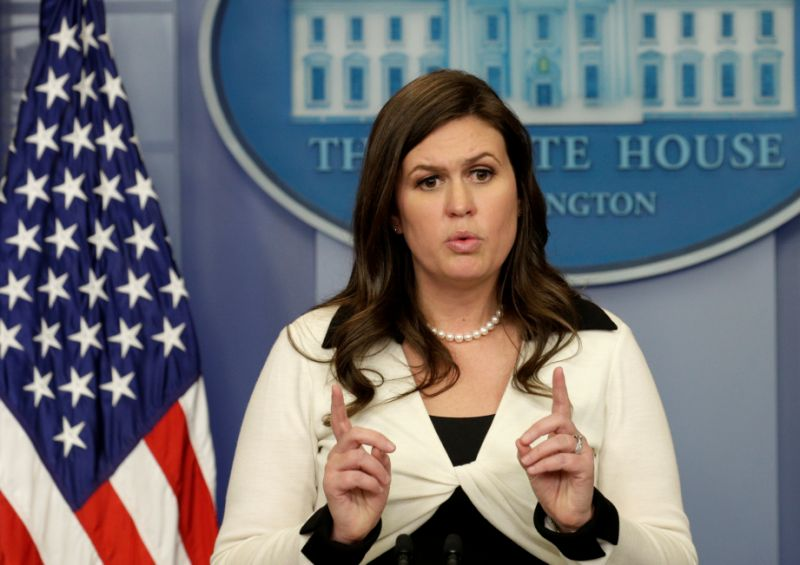
Sanders in 2017 while White House deputy press secretary

After Trump was elected, Sanders was named to the position of deputy White House press secretary in his new administration. On May 5, 2017, she held her first White House press briefing, standing in for Press Secretary Sean Spicer, who was serving on Naval Reserve duty. She continued to cover for Spicer until his return to the podium on May 12. She stood in for Spicer during the dismissal of James Comey and the controversy following it. Her defense of the Trump administration's actions led to some speculation that Trump was considering promoting her to replace Spicer. This was denied at the time by her father. But on May 26, The Wall Street Journal again suggested that Sanders was being considered as a possible replacement for Spicer, in the context of wider staff changes and the investigation into alleged communications with Russia. She continued to fill in for Spicer occasionally.

After Trump dismissed FBI director James Comey in May 2017, Sanders said that she "heard from countless members of the FBI that are grateful and thankful for the President's decision" to fire him. Emails show that several FBI heads of regional field offices and high-ranking FBI members reacted with dismay to Comey's firing. After Trump sought to discredit Comey and the FBI, Sanders was questioned on a tweet she had sent during the 2016 presidential election that "when you're attacking FBI agents because you're under criminal investigation, you're losing". After Comey accused Trump of lying about the circumstances in which he was dismissed, Sanders defended Trump: "I can definitively say the president is not a liar, and I think it's frankly insulting that question would be asked."

On June 27, 2017, during a press briefing, Sanders criticized the media, accusing them of spreading "fake news" about Trump. Sanders cited a video created by James O'Keefe. Although unsure of the video's accuracy, she said, "I would encourage everyone in this room and, frankly, everybody across the country to take a look at it." The video features CNN's health and medical producer, John Bonifield, saying that CNN's coverage of the Trump campaign's alleged links to Russia are "mostly bullshit" and driven by ratings. Special counsel Robert Mueller found that Russia did interfere with the election, but "did not find that the Trump campaign, or anyone associated with it, conspired or coordinated with the Russian government in these efforts".

On June 29, 2017, Sanders said during a press briefing that the "president in no way, form or fashion has ever promoted or encouraged violence." In February 2016, Trump had said during a campaign speech: "So if you see somebody getting ready to throw a tomato, knock the crap out of them, would you?... I promise you, I will pay for the legal fees. I promise." PolitiFact also "found at least seven other examples in which Trump offered public musings that showed a tolerance for, and sometimes even a favorable disposition towards physical violence."

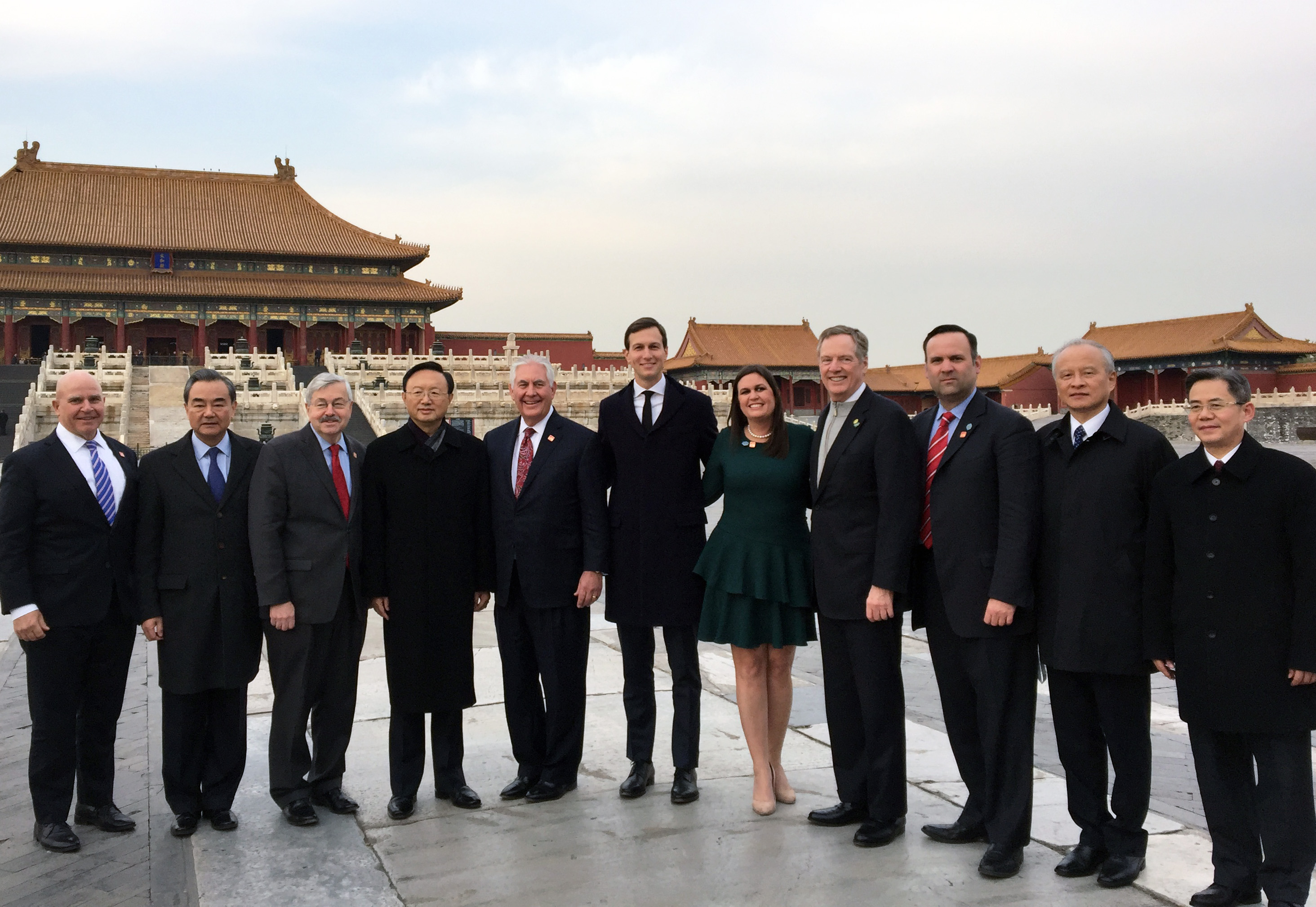
Sanders with Rex Tillerson, Jared Kushner, Robert Lighthizer, and Wang Yi in Beijing, China, November 2017

On July 21, 2017, after Spicer announced that he was going to resign, newly appointed White House Communications Director Anthony Scaramucci announced that Sanders would take the role of White House press secretary. Sanders is the third woman to hold the role of White House Press Secretary after Dee Dee Myers in 1993 and Dana Perino in 2007. Sanders is the first mother, and first working mother, to ever hold the position.

In August 2017, Sanders said Trump "certainly didn't dictate" a statement released by Donald Trump Jr. about the 2016 Trump Tower meeting with Russians. She also said that Trump "weighed in, offered suggestion like any father would do." In January 2018, Trump's lawyers wrote to the special counsel investigation that "the President dictated" the statement Donald Trump Jr. released. In June 2018, the media asked Sanders to explain the discrepancy in the statements, but she repeatedly refused to answer, saying: "I'm not going to respond to a letter from the president's outside counsel ... We've purposefully walled off, and I would refer you to them for comment", and "I'm an honest person".

In October 2017, CBS News's Jacqueline Alemany asked Sanders whether the official White House position was that all 16 women who accused Trump of sexual harassment were lying. Sanders responded, "Yeah, we've been clear on that since the beginning, and the President has spoken on it", without elaborating. In November 2017, Trump retweeted three unverified anti-Muslim videos by Britain First, a far-right British group with a history of posting misleading videos. Sanders commented, "Whether it's a real video, the threat is real and that is what the president is talking about, that's what the president is focused on, is dealing with those real threats, and those are real no matter how you're looking at it." Theresa May, the prime minister of the United Kingdom, was among those to criticize Trump's actions.

In February 2018, after Rob Porter left the White House over domestic abuse allegations, Sanders said that Porter's background check was "ongoing, and the White House had not received any specific papers regarding the completion of that background check". After FBI director Christopher Wray testified that the FBI had finished and submitted its security-clearance investigation on Porter to the White House earlier in July 2017, Sanders instead claimed that it was instead the White House's personnel security office's investigation that was ongoing, which contradicted her earlier statement that the clearance process "doesn't operate within the White House". She said that Porter had made a "personal decision" to leave the White House, while White House deputy press secretary Raj Shah said that Porter was "terminated".

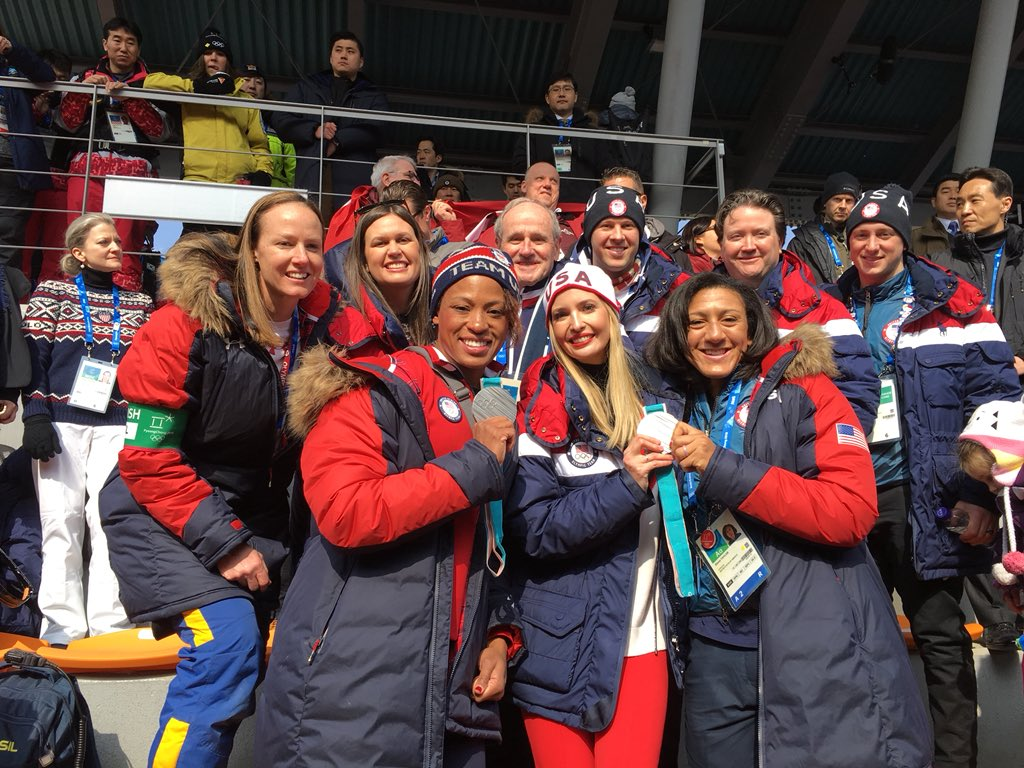
Sanders with Ivanka Trump, Lauren Gibbs, and Shauna Rohbock at the 2018 Winter Olympics in Pyeongchang, South Korea

In March 2018, Sanders said of the Stormy Daniels–Donald Trump scandal, "there was no knowledge of any payments from the president" to Daniels. In May 2018, Trump's lawyer Rudy Giuliani said that Trump had repaid his lawyer Michael Cohen $130,000 after Cohen paid Daniels. In response to questions about the discrepancy, Sanders claimed that she did not know of this development and that her earlier statement was based on the "best information" she had at the time. In mid-June 2018, when questioned on the Trump administration's family separation policy, which resulted in the separation of migrant children from their parents at the Mexico–United States border, Sanders falsely blamed Democrats for the policy and said "it is very biblical" to implement the policy. Christian leaders such as Cardinal Daniel DiNardo and Franklin Graham strongly disagreed with the policy, calling it "immoral" or "disgraceful", while Bible scholar and professor Matthew Schlimm said that the Bible was being misused just as slave traders and Nazis had done.

In July 2018, Sanders said the Trump White House would discuss allowing Russian agents to interrogate former U.S. ambassador to Russia Michael McFaul. The Russian government had harassed and intimidated McFaul for years, without specifying what criminal allegations they would interrogate him about. U.S. State Department spokeswoman Heather Nauert said that she could not answer on the White House's behalf, but that the State Department considered the Russian allegations against McFaul "absolutely absurd". Several current and former diplomats condemned the White House's willingness to entertain Russian interrogation of a former U.S. ambassador.

In an August 2018 press conference, Sanders was repeatedly asked by Jim Acosta, a CNN reporter, to say that the press was not the "enemy of the people", and she did not do so. Sanders had a tumultuous relationship with the press and was the subject of numerous personal attacks regarding her looks and her weight. That same month, The Washington Post reported that Sanders and her deputy Bill Shine strategized optimal times to release announcements that the security clearances of various Trump critics and officials involved in the probe into Russian interference in the 2016 election had been revoked. The announcements were intended to be released to distract from news cycles that were unfavorable to the White House.

The morning after publication of the September 5, 2018, New York Times op-ed "I Am Part of the Resistance Inside the Trump Administration", Sanders used her official government Twitter account to tweet that the anonymous writer was a "gutless loser" and to charge that those in the newspaper's opinion department are "the only ones complicit in this deceitful act". Her September 6 tweet gave the telephone number of the newspaper's opinion desk, and two former White House ethics chiefs declared that her tweet had violated federal law in an abuse of power, similar to her June 23, 2018, tweet specifically naming the restaurant that had refused her service in the Red Hen restaurant controversy.

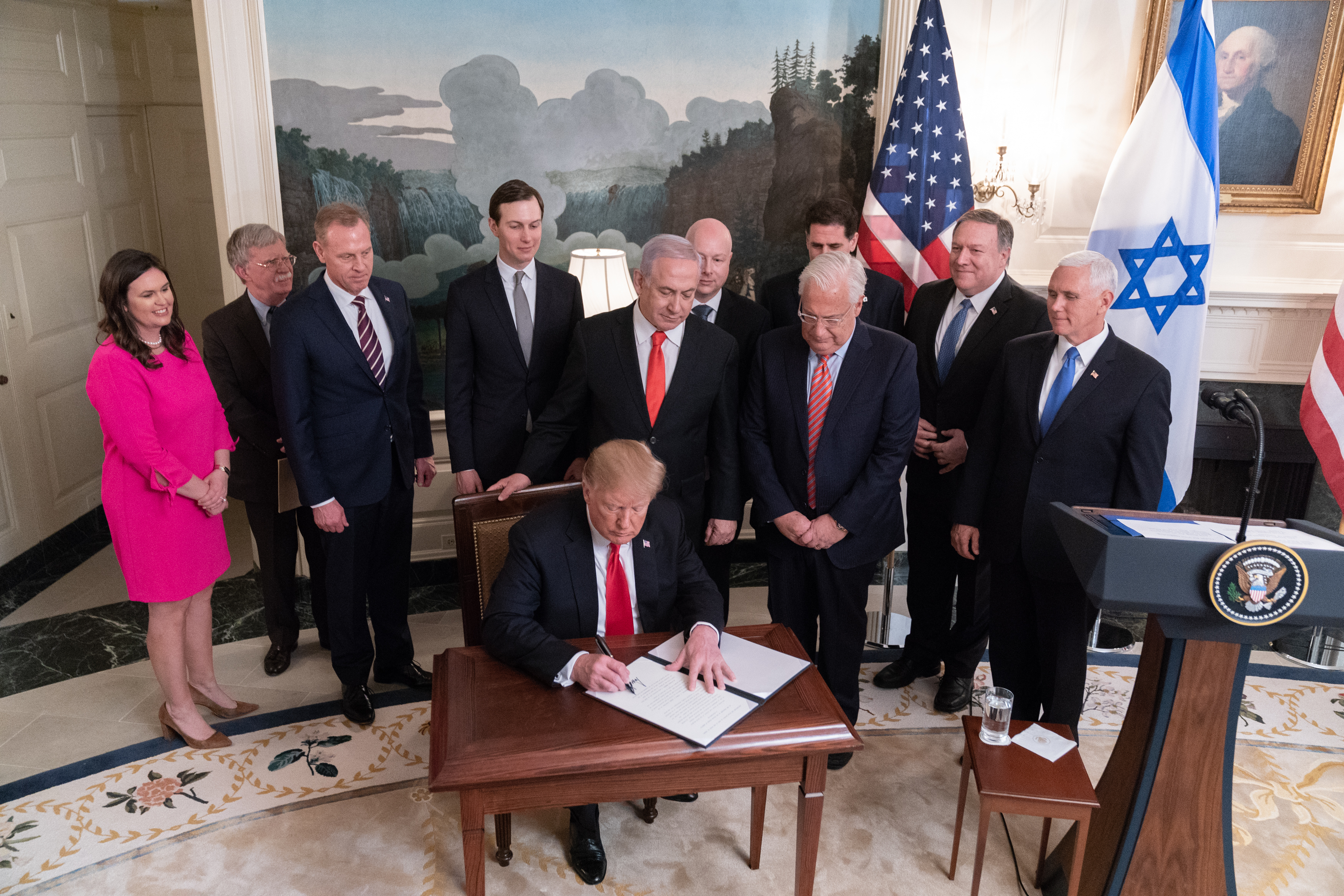
President Trump, joined by Netanyahu, Pence, Kushner, and Sanders, signs the proclamation which recognized Israel's 1981 annexation of the Golan Heights, March 2019.

In early November, CNN's Jim Acosta engaged in a verbal argument with Trump. While Acosta was asking Trump a question, an intern, at Trump's direction, tried to take away Acosta's microphone. Later in the day, Acosta's White House credentials were suspended, a move that was widely criticized as unprecedented. The next day, to justify the White House's actions, Sanders released a video of the moment the intern tried to grab the microphone from Acosta's hand. The video originated from conspiracy theorist Paul Joseph Watson of the far-right website Infowars, and was allegedly altered to make Acosta seem aggressive and excluded him saying, "Pardon me, ma'am", to the intern. Watson denied that the video was doctored in any way. CNN Communications Executive called Sanders's sharing of the video "shameful" and the White House News Photographers Association said it was "appalled" by her actions, called video manipulation "deceptive, dangerous and unethical", and said that what Sanders did was "equally problematic".

During the 2018–2019 federal government shutdown caused by Congress's refusal to fulfill Trump's demand for $5.7 billion in federal funds for a U.S.–Mexico border wall, Sanders argued that the wall was necessary, claiming that the CBP stopped nearly 4,000 known or suspected terrorists when they crossed the Mexico border in 2018. Data obtained by NBC News contradicted Sanders's assertion, showing that from October 1, 2017, to March 31, 2018, only six immigrants on the No Fly List (also known as the terror watch list) were encountered at ports of entry on the Mexico border. In an interview with Chris Wallace on Fox News, Wallace countered her claim of nearly 4,000 terrorists, saying, "I know the statistic. I didn't know if you were going to use it, but I studied up on this. Do you know where those 4,000 people come—where they are captured? Airports." In January 2019 Sanders said on the Christian Broadcasting Network that she thinks "God calls all of us to fill different roles at different times, and I think that he wanted Donald Trump to become president".

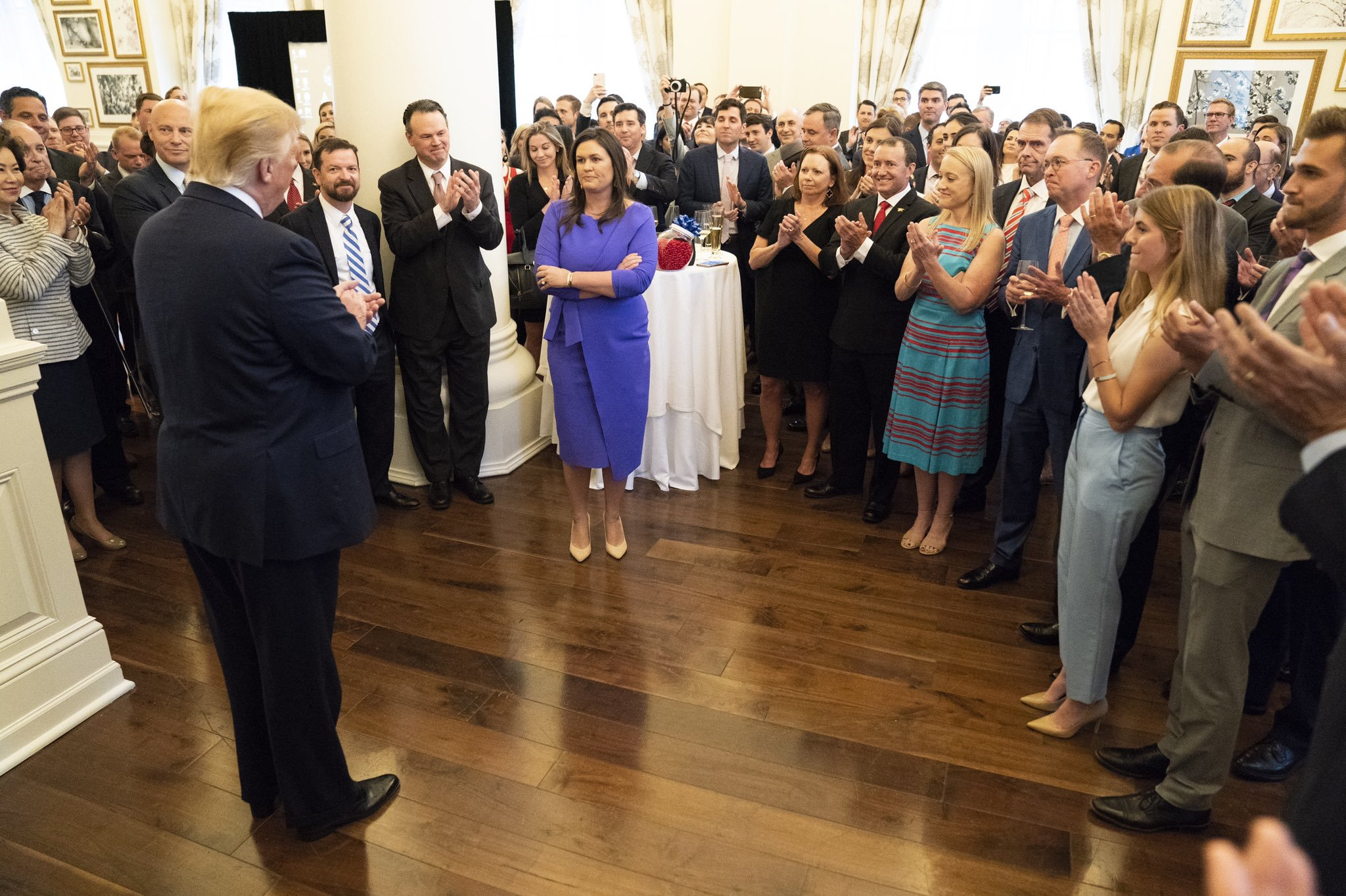
Sanders, President Donald Trump, and other White House staff members at her last appearance as White House press secretary on June 28, 2019

On June 13, 2019, Trump tweeted that Sanders would leave her role as press secretary on June 30. Under Sanders, the White House set at least three records for the most days between formal press briefings. The White House had a 41-day streak that ended in January 2019, then a 42-day streak that ended in March 2019, followed by 94 days and counting without a formal press briefing when Sanders's departure was announced.

=== Mueller report findings ===
On April 18, 2019, the first volume of the Mueller report, the Special Counsel Investigation report compiled by Robert Mueller, revealed that Sanders admitted that she had lied during a press conference when she said various things about James Comey, the former FBI director. This included lying about the firing of former Attorney General Jeff Sessions and Deputy Attorney General Rod Rosenstein's connection to Comey's firing, and her claim that "countless" FBI agents had lost faith in him. She repeatedly told the press that "countless members" of the FBI had contacted her to complain about Comey, but admitted to investigators that her claims were "a slip of the tongue" and "not founded on anything". When a redacted version of the special counsel's report was publicly revealed, Sanders defended herself, saying that her comments about the FBI agents were made in "the heat of the moment" and unscripted.

Sanders also lied about Trump's being in charge of a statement regarding the Trump Tower meeting. He worked on said statement with his advisor Hope Hicks, and when the emails about that statement were made public, it was reported that he had helped with it himself. According to the report, Sanders also made false statements about when Trump decided to fire Comey, as well as lying about Sessions's and Rosenstein's involvement in Comey's firing. The New York Times said that the revelation of false statements showed a "culture of dishonesty" at the White House. Of Sanders defending her comments on FBI agents, The New York Times wrote: "It has been a hallmark of the Trump White House never to admit a mistake, never to apologize and never to cede a point. This case was no different."

Sanders's rhetoric about the report was found to be misleading or false. In March 2019, after Attorney General William Barr released a summary of Mueller's report on Russian interference in the 2016 election, Sanders falsely claimed that the investigation's findings were "a total and complete exoneration". The summary of the report stated it "does not exonerate him". Sanders repeated her false suggestion that the report exonerated Trump in May 2019, and falsely claimed that Mueller had "closed the case". The Associated Press noted, "Mueller did not fully exonerate Trump or declare that a possible case against Trump to be 'closed.' Mueller announced his work was finished specifically leaving it open for Congress to decide on possible charges of wrongdoing."

== Career after the White House ==
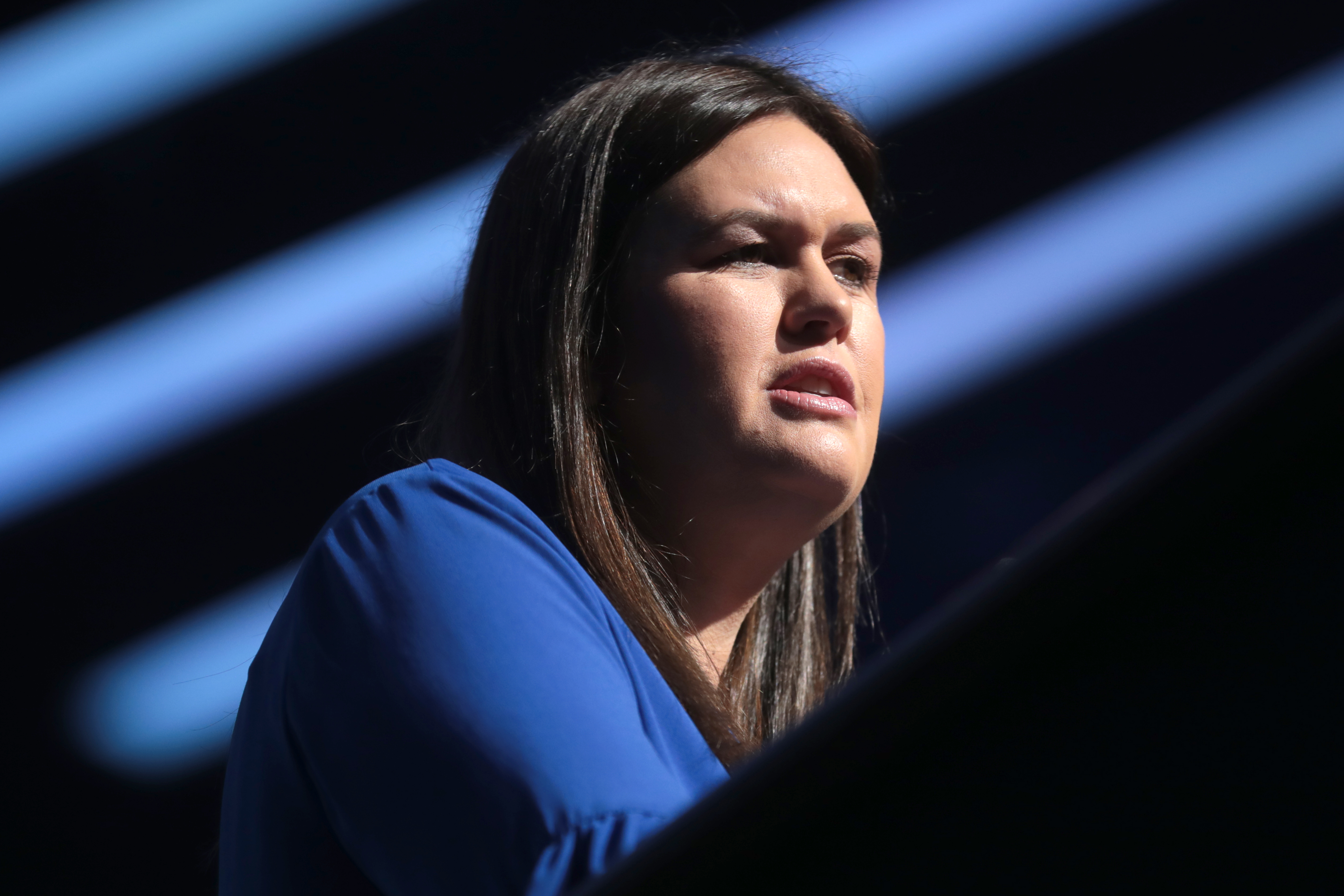
Sanders giving a speech in 2019 after departing the Trump Administration

On August 22, 2019, Fox News announced that Sanders would become a contributor to the network, effective September 6. During the December 2019 Democratic presidential debate, Sanders mocked Joe Biden's stutter on Twitter. She apologized the next day. Following the January 6 United States Capitol attack, the editor of Forbes warned corporations against hiring Sanders and other Trump "propagandists", writing, "Forbes will assume that everything your company or firm talks about is a lie."

=== 2022 Arkansas gubernatorial election ===
Final results by county in 2022: Sarah Huckabee Sanders: 80–90%; 70–80%; 60–70%; 50–60%; 40–50%; Chris Jones: 60–70%; 50–60%; 40–50%

On January 25, 2021, Sanders announced her candidacy for governor of Arkansas, an office her father, Mike Huckabee, held from 1996 to 2007. A day later, Trump endorsed Sanders, calling her "a warrior". On July 16, 2021, Sanders broke the Arkansas gubernatorial fundraising record by raising over $9 million. Running during the COVID-19 pandemic, she pledged not to implement any mask mandates or vaccine mandates. She also supported restrictions on abortion, saying that she would not support exceptions for rape and incest in anti-abortion legislation.

In October 2021, the Arkansas Law Notes published an article that called into question whether Sanders was even eligible to run for governor. The article centers on whether Sanders meets the State Constitution's residency requirement of seven years. Sanders handily won the Republican primary and defeated Democratic nominee Chris Jones in the general election. On November 9, 2022, it was announced that Sanders had won the race and would become Arkansas's first female governor and the first woman to be governor of a state where her father was governor.

== Governor of Arkansas (2023–present) ==
=== Tenure ===
Sanders was sworn in on January 10, 2023. On her first day in office, Sanders banned the term Latinx from being officially used in the state government. The decision came after hearing feedback from Hispanic leaders in the state, state lawmakers and senior members of staff.

==== Abortion ====
In 2023, Sanders signed a bill to allow a privately funded anti-abortion "monument to the unborn" to be displayed on Capitol grounds. The monument will mark the number of abortions performed in Arkansas before the U.S. Supreme Court overturned Roe v. Wade.

==== Education ====
===== LEARNS Act =====
On March 8, 2023, Sanders signed her signature education reform bill, the "LEARNS Act", into law. The law includes a number of provisions that would expand school choice, raise teacher pay, and ban teaching critical race theory.

School choice expansion efforts included an Educational Freedom Account program that would expand access to school choice to all K-12 students after three years. The program provides up to 90% of the annual per-student public school funding rate for usage on education expenses, which includes private school tuition. It requires all participating schools to administer annual, state-approved testing, along with random annual audits of the participating schools' individual accounts. It includes provisions to remove limits on the number of charter schools, remove the 3% cap on school choice transfers unless a school district is under a desegregation order, and absorb the previously enacted Succeed Scholarship Program, which provided roughly $7,400 for disabled, foster, and military children.

The LEARNS Act also affects teacher pay and education policies. The state raised the starting teacher salary from $36,000 to $50,000 and required that teachers be paid at least $2,000 more for the 2023-24 school year, while eliminating the minimum salary increase schedule for teachers based on education level and experience. It created a fund to support minimum salary levels, but required school districts to use 80% of their funding allocated for salary increases before qualifying for state funding to support the increase; a provision was included allowing schools to apply for waivers of this policy if it would cause them to go into fiscal distress. LEARNS also repeals incentives for teacher recruitment in "high priority" districts and creates a Merit Teacher Incentive Fund that provides annual bonuses of up to $10,000 for eligible teachers based on merit performances.

The LEARNS Act repealed the Teacher Fair Dismissal Act and the Public School Employee Fair Hearing Act, instead changing policy to specify that employees have a right to notice of a recommendation for termination from the public school district and a hearing before the school board. Superintendents may no longer hire employees based on seniority or tenure, and instead must consider only performance and effectiveness. Other stipulations include requiring superintendents to consult with teachers before hiring a principal and allowing school boards to employ one or more assistant superintendents.

Provisions affecting student education and content include required literacy screenings for K-3 students and access to literacy coaches for K-3 students in D- and F-rated schools; students not meeting third-grade reading standards are to be held back from advancing to fourth grade the next year. Several prohibitions of content were implemented, including "indoctrination" or critical race theory, along with content that is sexually explicit or pertains to reproduction, gender identity, or sexual orientation before grade 5. Graduation criteria were changed, requiring students to have completed 75 hours of community service by the 2026-27 school year, allowing students to earn a diploma through a career-ready pathway rather than the traditional pathway, and allowing students in C- through F-rated schools to take courses not offered at their school elsewhere through the Course Choice Program.

Other LEARNS Act provisions include a 50/50 cost-sharing policy between the state and school districts that allows teachers to take 12 weeks of maternity leave, along with changes to the student loan repayment process for teachers. It also requires eligible postsecondary institutions to create an Arkansas Teacher Academy to encourage people to enter the teaching profession. School Transformation Contracts were also created, allowing public school districts with D or F ratings to be exempt from a state takeover if they instead partner with an open enrollment charter school or other State Board of Education-approved entity. Early childhood education is also addressed, with requirements for the relocation and creation of Early Childhood Education offices and systems into the Arkansas Department of Education.

===== Public response to the LEARNS Act =====
The passage of the LEARNS Act drew mixed reactions. State Senate Minority Leader Tippi McCullough, a Democrat from Little Rock, expressed concern, saying, "LEARNS will dismantle and defund our public schools through a voucher system that has not worked anywhere ever. While some of the bill is admirable, its purported benefits will not reach our students in greatest need."

After the law went into effect, concerns rose about potential consolidation due to the bill. The Marvell–Elaine School District in rural Phillips County was scheduled to be consolidated under the Education Reorganization Act, which Governor Mike Huckabee signed into law in 2004, due to having fewer than 350 students and an F rating. State Senator John Payton, a Republican from Wilburn who voted for the LEARNS Act, proposed S.B. 292, which would eliminate the Education Reorganization Act's requirement that school districts whose two-year average daily attendance drops below 350 be consolidated. Sanders signed the bill into law after its passage on March 29, 2023. State Representative Mark McElroy, a Republican from Tillar who also voted for LEARNS and whose district includes the Marvell-Elaine school district, proposed an additional bill that included exceptions for districts that are classified as in need of Level 5 – Intensive support and that have students who would have to ride a bus more than 40 miles to attend the new consolidated district. The Marvell-Elaine School District ultimately remained open under a $200,000 transformation contract authorized by LEARNS, with the Friendship Education Foundation Arkansas managing the district.

The Citizens for Arkansas Public Education and Students (CAPES) initiated an effort to repeal LEARNS. The Arkansas Constitution allows citizens to place a referendum of any act passed by the General Assembly on the ballot by petition. CAPES had roughly 55 days to gather signatures from 6% of the total votes cast for governor in the previous election along with 3% of voters in at least 50 counties each. CAPES fell about 500 signatures short of the 54,422 signatures needed by July 31, 2023, to place the referendum on the ballot.

==== Response to disasters and emergencies ====
On March 31, 2023, Sanders declared a state of emergency in Arkansas after a tornado outbreak hit the state. This activated the National Guard, which began assisting with the recovery effort. Sanders also announced that she had spoken to President Joe Biden, who promised Arkansas federal aid to assist with the recovery.

On April 5, 2024, Sanders declared a five-day state of emergency in Arkansas ahead of the solar eclipse of April 8, releasing $100,000 from the state Response and Recovery Fund to assist with the state's response to the eclipse while waiving certain federal restrictions on commercial traffic for up to 14 days. Money from the disaster fund was to be used at the discretion of A.J. Gary, director of the Department of Public Safety's Division of Emergency Management, "to defray both program and administrative costs".

On March 14–15, 2025, severe storms impacted the state of Arkansas. Sanders declared a state of emergency and made a request for a major disaster declaration to the federal government, however, the request was initially denied by FEMA and President Trump. After an appeal from Sanders and Arkansas' Congressional delegation to reconsider, Trump approved the declaration on May 13, 2025.

On April 5, 2025, a major disaster declaration request made by Sanders was approved by Trump and FEMA for severe storms and flooding that began on April 2, 2025.

==== Spending controversy and freedom of information ====
In June 2023, Sanders's office purchased a custom-made lectern for $19,029.25. The Arkansas Republican Party later reimbursed the governor's office for the lectern several days after a Freedom of Information Act request for the purchasing documents was filed. An executive assistant was instructed to add the note "to be reimbursed" to the original invoice and leave the note undated. After substantial media coverage of the purchase, the Arkansas State Legislature began an audit. Sanders denied any impropriety and said she welcomed the audit.

The audit showed that the lectern was purchased from Beckett Events LLC, a Virginia-based company run by political consultant and lobbyist Virginia Beckett, for $11,575. Beckett charged $2,500 for a "consulting fee" and $2,200 for the road case. The remainder of the cost represented shipping, delivery, and a credit-card processing fee. Similar lectern models are listed online for $7,500 or less, while the purchased lectern had no microphone or electronic components aside from a light. Sanders said it had additional features that contributed to its cost, including a custom height. The audit also found that a staff member had contacted an Arkansas-based equipment dealer and received a quote for portable podiums ranging in cost from $800 to $1,500. After Sanders proposed to deny public access to certain gubernatorial records, she faced public pushback. She later signed a law limiting public access to information about her security detail and her travels.

==== Other issues ====
In October 2023, Sanders signed an executive order to eliminate the usage of "woke, anti-woman words" from official state documents. Banned terms include "womxn", "birth-giver", and "chestfeeding". The order was criticized by the ACLU. On March 18, 2025, Sanders signed the nitrogen hypoxia death penalty bill into law, making Arkansas the fifth state to allow execution by nitrogen hypoxia.

In November 2023, Arkansas-based Cooks Venture shut down operations. It informed contract farmers that it lacked the funds to process or feed any chickens and would kill all ~1.3 million birds. On December 8, state senator Bryan King sent Sanders a letter asking her to declare a state of emergency over the animal welfare, environmental, disease, and economic concerns of the killing of the birds. Sanders denied the request, calling it contrary to the values of free and fair markets.

== In popular culture ==
At the 2018 White House Correspondents Dinner, during a comedy roast of the Trump administration, stand-up comedian Michelle Wolf delivered several pointed jokes about Sanders, including one that provoked heated controversy:

I actually really like Sarah. I think she's very resourceful. She burns facts, and then she uses that ash to create a perfect smoky eye. Like maybe she's born with it, maybe it's lies. It's probably lies.

Some women in the press corps took offense at Wolf's joke, with Maggie Haberman of The New York Times tweeting, "That @PressSec sat and absorbed intense criticism of her physical appearance, her job performance, and so forth, instead of walking out, on national television, was impressive." MSNBC co-host Mika Brzezinski responded, "Watching a wife and mother be humiliated on national television for her looks is deplorable."

Like several of her White House colleagues, Sanders was satirized on Saturday Night Live, where she was portrayed by Aidy Bryant. In April 2023, the Anheuser-Busch brewing company hired TikToker Dylan Mulvaney, a transgender woman and activist, to promote Bud Light. Many conservative celebrities boycotted Bud Light as a result. Sanders supported the boycott by promoting "Real Women" beer can koozies. On her Twitter account, she captioned a video, "Real women don't have to fake it." The koozies featured images of Sanders, Alabama governor Kay Ivey, Iowa governor Kim Reynolds, and South Dakota governor Kristi Noem. Sanders's activities met with mixed media responses.

== Personal life ==
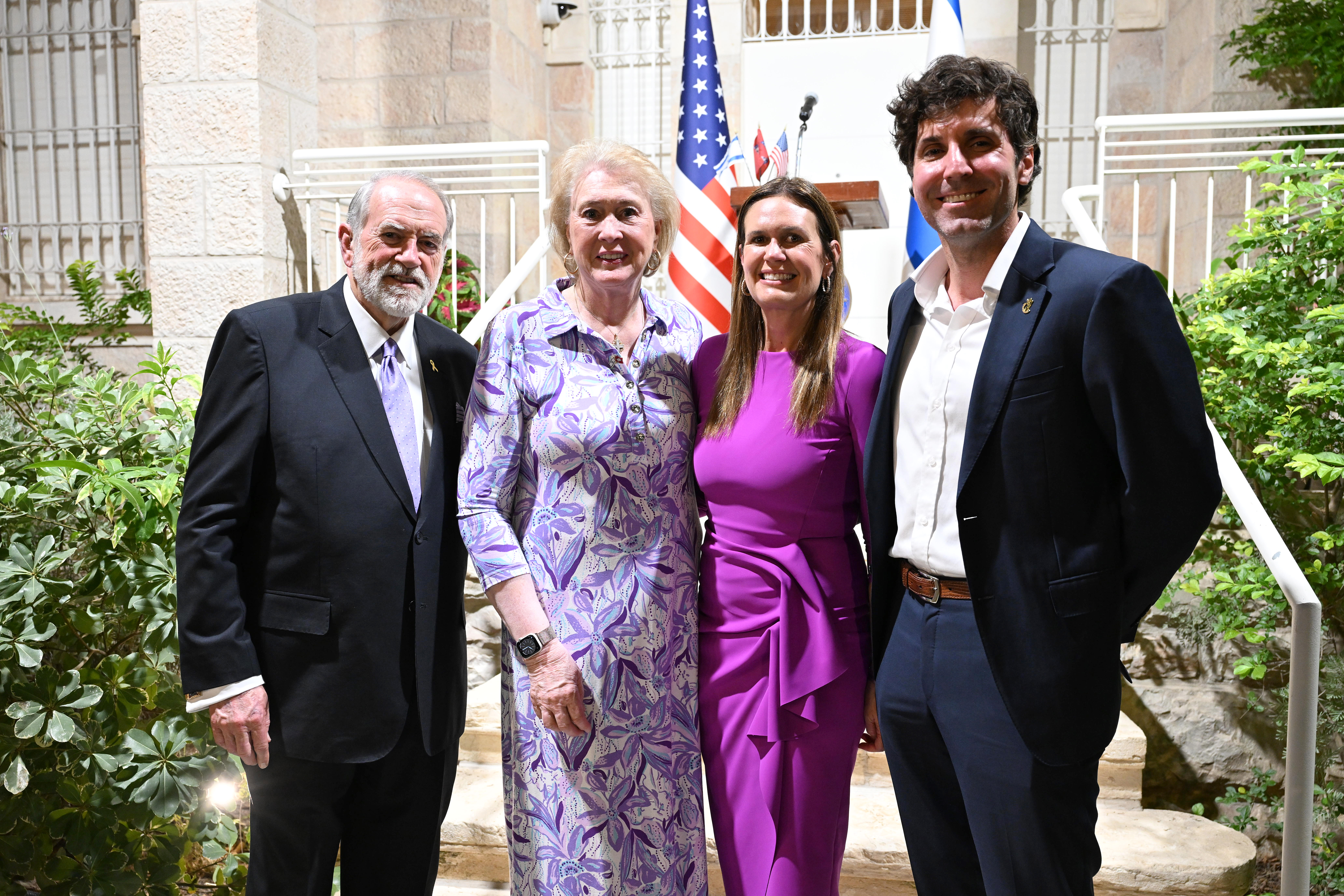
Mike Huckabee, Janet Huckabee, Sarah Huckabee Sanders, and Bryan Sanders in August 2025.

Huckabee met Bryan Sanders during her father's 2008 presidential campaign. She was the campaign's field director, and Sanders was hired as a media consultant. The couple married in 2010. They have three children.

On June 22, 2018, a co-owner of a 26-seat restaurant in Lexington, Virginia, 200 miles (320 km) from Washington, D.C., asked Sanders to leave the restaurant because she worked for the Trump administration, giving rise to the Red Hen restaurant controversy.

Sanders was diagnosed with papillary thyroid cancer in September 2022. She had surgery to remove her thyroid and the surrounding lymph nodes.

In April 2024, Sanders joined the Daughters of the American Revolution.

== Electoral history ==
2022 Arkansas gubernatorial election Republican primary results
Party	Candidate	Votes	%
Republican	Sarah Huckabee Sanders	289,249	83.14%
Republican	Francis "Doc" Washburn	58,638	16.86%
Total votes		347,887	100.0%

2022 Arkansas gubernatorial election
Party	Candidate	Votes	%	±%
Republican	Sarah Huckabee Sanders	571,105	62.96%	−2.37%
Democratic	Chris Jones	319,242	35.20%	+3.43%
Libertarian	Ricky Dale Harrington Jr.	16,690	1.84%	−1.06%
Total votes		907,037	100.0%	N/A
Turnout		907,037	50.81%	
Registered electors		1,799,136		
Republican hold				

2026 Arkansas gubernatorial election
Party	Candidate	Votes	%
Republican	Sarah Huckabee Sanders	477,304	53.87
Democratic	Fredrick Love	341,842	38.58
Libertarian	Colt Shelby	66,913	7.55
Write-in			
Total votes		886,059	100.00

Political offices
Preceded by Sean Spicer	White House Press Secretary; 2017–2019	Succeeded by Stephanie Grisham
Preceded by Asa Hutchinson	Governor of Arkansas; 2023–present	Incumbent
Party political offices
Preceded by Asa Hutchinson	Republican nominee for Governor of Arkansas; 2022, 2026	Most recent
Preceded by Kim Reynolds	Response to the State of the Union address 2023	Succeeded by Katie Britt
U.S. order of precedence (ceremonial)
Preceded by JD Vance as Vice President	Order of precedence of the United States; Within Arkansas	Succeeded by Mayor of city in which event is held
Preceded by JD Vance as Vice President	Order of precedence of the United States; Within Arkansas	Succeeded by Otherwise Mike Johnson as Speaker of the House
Preceded by Mike Kehoe as Governor of Missouri	Order of precedence of the United States; Outside Arkansas	Succeeded by Gretchen Whitmer as Governor of Michigan
