= Lanny Fite =

American politician

Lanny E. Fite

Member of the Arkansas House of Representatives from the 23rd district
- In office January 2015 – January 9, 2023
- Preceded by: Ann Clemmer

Member of the Arkansas House of Representatives from the 83rd district
- In office January 9, 2023 – December 31, 2024
- Preceded by: Keith Slape
- Succeeded by: Paul Childress

Personal details
- Born: c. 1950
- Party: Republican
- Spouse: Sherri Fite
- Children: Two children
- Education: Benton High School
- Occupation: Former Saline County Judge

Lanny E. Fite (born c. 1950) is a retired county judge for Saline County, Arkansas and former Republican member of the Arkansas House of Representatives. He represented District 23 until redistricting and later served District 83 during his final term before retiring in 2024.

In 2014, he was elected without opposition to succeed the term-limited Ann Clemmer, a fellow Republican who instead ran unsuccessfully for the United States House of Representatives for Arkansas's 2nd congressional district. In his first term in office, Fite served on the House committees of (1) Revenue and Tax Committee, (2) State Agencies and Governmental Affairs Committee, and (3) the Legislative Council.

Fite graduated from Benton High School in Benton, the seat of government of Saline County. He is a member of Lions International and Holland Chapel Baptist Church. In 2011, he received the Professional of the Year Award from the University of Arkansas at Little Rock. In 2001, he was the "Benton Citizen of the Year." He formerly lived in North Little Rock, Cabot, and Lonoke, Arkansas.
