= Richard Wang =

Richard Wang may refer to:

- Richard Wang (chess player) (born 1998), Canadian chess player
- Richard Wang (athlete) (born 1947), dragon boat racer and sport shooter
- Richard Y. Wang, executive director of MIT CDOIQ program
