= Ann Clemmer =

American politician

Ann Veasman Clemmer

Member of the Arkansas House of Representatives from the 29th district
- In office January 2009 – January 2013
- Preceded by: Janet Johnson
- Succeeded by: Fredrick Love

Member of the Arkansas House of Representatives from the 23rd district
- In office January 2013 – January 2015
- Preceded by: Randy Stewart
- Succeeded by: Lanny Fite

Personal details
- Born: August 10, 1958 (age 68) Mississippi County, Arkansas, USA
- Party: Republican
- Spouse: Jamie Clemmer
- Children: Three daughters
- Education: Arkansas State University
- Occupation: Political scientist at University of Arkansas at Little Rock

Ann Veasman Clemmer (born August 10, 1958) is an American political scientist and politician from the U.S. state of Arkansas. A Republican, Clemmer is a former member of the Arkansas House of Representatives, having represented District 23 from 2013 to 2015. She was sworn in for her first term in 2009 in House District 29. Clemmer is also credited as being the first woman ever to preside over the Arkansas House in the state's history, during the 2014 special session held in the Old State House; it was the first time the state legislature convened in the building in more than a century.

== Background ==
Clemmer received her Bachelor's and Master's degree from Arkansas State University and served as a faculty member at University of Arkansas at Little Rock. She is the former president of the Arkansas Political Science Association.

She currently works as partner for the Little Rock based Capital Consulting Firm.

== State House career ==
In 2008, Clemmer won her first term in the state House in District 29, when she defeated the Democrat Scott Smith, 9,505 (63.3 percent) to 5,518 (36.7 percent). She was unopposed in 2010 and 2012, when she was transferred to District 23 for her third and final term in the state House.

Clemmer is a member of the Arkansas Legislative Council and Vice Chairman of the House Education Committee. She also sits on the House committees on (1) Rules and (2) State Agencies and Governmental Affairs. She is a member of the subcommittees on Early Childhood, Higher Education, and House Elections.

On May 20, 2014, Clemmer finished second in a three-way primary with only 22% of the vote in the Republican primary for Arkansas's 2nd congressional district seat in the United States House of Representatives. The position was vacated by U.S. Representative Tim Griffin, who was subsequently elected lieutenant governor. Her congressional race was severely hurt by a scandal involving Clemmer's treasurer, Alex Reed, allegedly embezzling a large amount from her congressional campaign account and was forced to resign.

Preceded by Janet Johnson	Arkansas State Representative from District 29 (Saline County); 2009–2013	Succeeded by Fredrick Love
Preceded by Randy Stewart	Arkansas State Representative from District 23 (Saline County); 2013–2015	Succeeded by Lanny Fite
