= Fredrick Love =

American politician (born 1974)

Fred Love
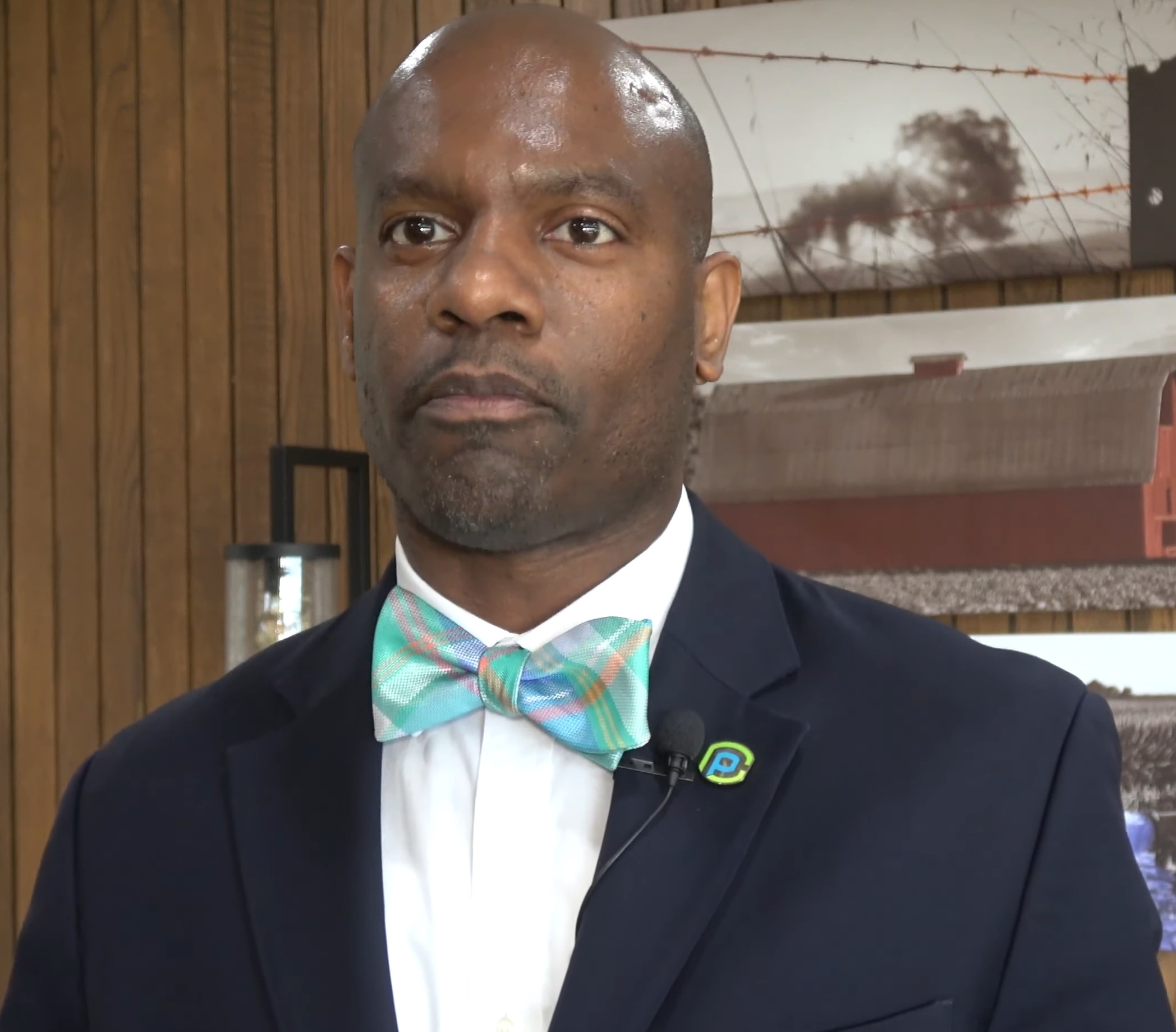
- Love in 2021

Member of the Arkansas Senate from the 15th district
- Incumbent
- Assumed office January 9, 2023
- Preceded by: Ken Bragg (redistricted)

Minority Leader of the Arkansas House of Representatives
- In office May 16, 2019 – January 11, 2021
- Preceded by: Charles Blake
- Succeeded by: Tippi McCullough

Member of the Arkansas House of Representatives
- In office January 10, 2011 – January 9, 2023
- Preceded by: Pam Adcock
- Succeeded by: Rick McClure (redistricted)
- Constituency: 35th district (2011–2013); 29th district (2013–2023)

Personal details
- Born: December 14, 1974 (age 51) Little Rock, Arkansas, U.S.
- Party: Democratic
- Spouse: ShaRonda Love
- Children: 2
- Education: University of Arkansas, Little Rock (BA, MPA)
- Website: State senate website Campaign website

Fredrick J. Love is an American politician representing the 15th district in the Arkansas Senate since 2023. Love previously served in the Arkansas House of Representatives from 2011 to 2023. He was the Democratic nominee in the 2026 Arkansas gubernatorial election.

== Education ==
Love earned his bachelor's degree in political science and his master's degree in public administration from the University of Arkansas at Little Rock and a postbaccalaureate certificate in public health at the UAMS Medical Center. He was taught high school English by former state senator Joyce Elliott. Love worked for the Arkansas Foodbank for five years. He later worked for Pulaski County, Arkansas, most recently as director of community services until resigning in 2023. Love later sued the county for a hostile work environment and racially motivated investigations, but the suit was dismissed.

== Elections ==
=== Arkansas House of Representatives ===
When District 35 Representative Jim Lendall left the Legislature and left the seat open, Love ran in the three-way 2004 Democratic primary, but lost to Pam Adcock, who was unopposed for the November 2, 2004 General election.

When Representative Adcock left the Legislature and left the seat open, Love won the May 18, 2010 Democratic primary with 1,299 votes (58.0%), and won the November 2, 2010 General election with 3,995 votes (81.8%) against Independent candidate Rick Daes.

Redistricted to District 29, and with Republican Representative Ann Clemmer redistricted to District 23, Love was unopposed for both the May 22, 2012 Democratic primary and the November 6, 2012 General election.

=== Arkansas Senate ===
Following election to the Arkansas Senate in 2023, Love is term limited from serving in the General Assembly.

=== 2026 Arkansas governor election ===
In June 2025, Love announced his candidacy for the Democratic nomination in the 2026 Arkansas gubernatorial election. Love's campaign during the Democratic primary focused on his experience in the General Assembly, plans to create regional economic hubs around the state, protecting Arkansas's Medicaid expansion, stopping the state's school voucher program (Arkansas LEARNS Act), and opposing Governor Sarah Huckabee Sanders' plans for a 3,000 bed prison in Franklin County, Arkansas. On March 3, 2026, Love would secure the Democratic nomination for Governor of Arkansas after defeating Bentonville businesswoman Supha Xayprasith-Mays.

Arkansas House of Representatives
Preceded by Charles Blake	Minority Leader of the Arkansas House of Representatives; 2019–2021	Succeeded by Tippi McCullough
Party political offices
Preceded by Chris Jones	Democratic nominee for Governor of Arkansas; 2026	Most recent
