= Jim Keet =

American politician (born 1949)

Member of the Arkansas Senate from the 15th district
- In office January 1993 – January 1997
- Preceded by: Constituency established
- Succeeded by: Jim Argue

Member of the Arkansas House of Representatives from the 58th district
- In office January 1989 – January 1991
- Preceded by: Dana Moreland
- Succeeded by: Paul Doramus

Personal details
- Born: May 12, 1949 (age 77) Springfield, Missouri, U.S.
- Party: Republican
- Spouse: Margaret Osborn
- Children: 4
- Education: Southern Methodist University (BBA)

James Holland Keet (born May 12, 1949), is an American restaurateur and politician in Little Rock, Arkansas, and a former member of the Arkansas House of Representatives and Arkansas Senate. Keet was the Republican nominee for governor of Arkansas in 2010, but lost the race in a landslide to incumbent Democrat Mike Beebe. He was also previously the Republican nominee for Arkansas's 2nd congressional district in 1990, losing to Democrat Ray Thornton.

Party political offices
Preceded by Asa Hutchinson	Republican nominee for Governor of Arkansas; 2010	Succeeded by Asa Hutchinson
