= Wes Wagner =

American politician and attorney

Member of the Arkansas House of Representatives from the 54th district
- In office 2013–2015
- Preceded by: Hudson Hallom
- Succeeded by: David Wallace

Personal details
- Party: Republican 2016-Present; Democratic (until 2016)
- Spouse: Katy
- Education: Arkansas State University; University of Tulsa
- Occupation: Attorney

Wes Wagner is an attorney who was a Democratic member of the Arkansas House of Representatives, for the 54th district in the northeastern portion of his state.

Wagner was unseated after a single term in the November 4, 2014 general election by the Republican Dave Wallace, a town council member in Leachville and a decorated United States Army officer in the Vietnam War.

In the 2016 election, Wagner switched parties, becoming a Republican and entering the primary election, where he narrowly lost to Johnny Rye.
