= Johnny Rye =

American politician

Member of the Arkansas House of Representatives from the 36th district
- Incumbent
- Assumed office January 9, 2023
- Preceded by: Denise Jones Ennett

Member of the Arkansas House of Representatives from the 54th district
- In office January 9, 2017 – January 9, 2023
- Preceded by: David Wallace
- Succeeded by: Mary Bentley (redistricting)

Personal details
- Party: Republican
- Spouse: Julie Rye
- Children: One daughter
- Education: Arkansas State University

Johnny Rye is a Republican politician from the U.S. state of Arkansas. As of October 2022 he serves in the Arkansas House of Representatives, holding a seat he originally won in 2016.

== Biography ==
Rye graduated from Arkansas State University, and served as assessor for Poinsett County from 1991 to 2006. He lives in Trumann with his wife, Julie, with whom he has one daughter.

== State House ==
Rye was originally elected to the Arkansas State House in the 2016 election. In the Republican primary election, he faced a tight contest against Wes Wagner, who had switched parties away from the Democrats after being ousted from the seat in the 2014 general election by David Wallace (who himself chose to run for the Arkansas State Senate in 2016). Rye triumphed over Wagner in the primary, 51% to 49%, and went on to win the general election with 75% of the vote. Since then, he has faced no competition in primary elections, and only token Democratic opposition in the 2018 general, running completely unopposed in the 2020 and 2022 general elections.

In the State House, Rye serves on the Joint Committee on Energy, the Legislative Joint Auditing Committee, the House Public Transportation Committee, and the House City, County & Local Affairs Committee.
