= David Wallace (Arkansas politician) =

American politician

Member of the Arkansas Senate from the 19th district (Previously 22nd district)
- Incumbent
- Assumed office January 9, 2017
- Preceded by: David Burnett

Member of the Arkansas House of Representatives from the 54th district
- In office January 12, 2015 – January 9, 2017
- Preceded by: Wes Wagner
- Succeeded by: Johnny Rye

Personal details
- Party: Republican
- Spouse: Karen Wallace
- Education: Arkansas State University

Military service
- Allegiance: United States
- Branch/service: United States Army
- Years of service: 1970–1991
- Rank: Lieutenant Colonel
- Battles/wars: Vietnam War
- Awards: Distinguished Flying Cross; Bronze Star Medal

David Wallace is a United States Army officer and Republican politician currently serving in the Arkansas Senate since 2017.

== Biography ==
Wallace graduated from Leachville High School and Arkansas State University, where he was part of the ROTC program. After graduation, he was commissioned as a lieutenant in the U.S. Army, flying attack helicopters during the Vietnam War and eventually rising to the rank of Lieutenant Colonel.

Wallace founded a business specializing in disaster relief, Wallace Resources. He is married to Karen Wallace, with whom he had two children, and is a member of the Southern Baptist Church.

== Electoral history ==
Wallace won his Senate seat after defeating Democratic incumbent David Burnett 60.4% to 39.0% in the 2016 election, thus flipping the district. Previously, he served one term in the Arkansas House of Representatives, flipping that district upon winning the election there as well. He and fellow state senator James Sturch swapped districts during redistricting before the 2022 elections, putting Wallace in the 19th district for his third term.
