= A.J. Smith (artist) =

American printmaker and professor (born 1952)

A.J. Smith (born 1952) is an American printmaker, artist, and professor at the University of Arkansas at Little Rock. Smith's primary media are graphite pencil and printmaking. He is known for his large scale graphite portraits.

== Early life and education ==
Smith was born in Jonestown, Mississippi. received a BFA in painting and printmaking from Kansas City Art Institute and an MFA in painting and printmaking from Queens College, City University of New York.

== Personal life ==
A.J. Smith is married to Marjorie Williams-Smith.
