= Scott Baltz =

American politician

Member of the Arkansas House of Representatives from the 61st district
- In office January 14, 2013 – January 14, 2019
- Preceded by: Lori Benedict
- Succeeded by: Marsh Davis

Personal details
- Party: Democratic

Scott Baltz is an American politician who served as Democratic member of the Arkansas House of Representatives from 2013 to 2019. Baltz is a retired firefighter and EMT.

== Elections ==
- 2012 With District 61 Representative John Catlett redistricted to District 73, to challenge incumbent Republican Representative Lori Benedict (redistricted from District 82), Baltz was unopposed for the May 22, 2012 Democratic Primary, and won the November 6, 2012 General election with 5,429 votes (51.4%) against Representative Benedict.
