= University of Arkansas at Little Rock =

Public university in Little Rock, Arkansas, US

Coordinates: 34.722472°N 92.340650°W

- Former names: Little Rock Junior College (1927–1957); Little Rock University (1957–1969)
- Motto: Cultus, Veritas, Scientia
- Motto in English: Culture, Truth, Knowledge
- Type: Public research university
- Established: 1927; 99 years ago
- Parent institution: University of Arkansas System
- Academic affiliations: CUMU; space-grant
- Endowment: $144.56 million (2024)
- Chancellor: Christina Drale
- President: Jay B. Silveria
- Faculty: 362 (full-time)
- Administrative staff: 1,178
- Students: 8,026 (fall 2025)
- Location: Little Rock, Arkansas, United States
- Campus: Urban
- Colors: Maroon and silver
- Nickname: Trojans
- Sporting affiliations: NCAA Division I – OVC
- Website: ualr.edu

The University of Arkansas at Little Rock (UA Little Rock, UALR) is a public research university in Little Rock, Arkansas, United States. The university resides on a 250-acre (100 ha) campus, which encompasses more than 56 buildings including the Center for Nanotechnology Integrative Sciences, the Emerging Analytics Center, the Sequoyah Research Center, and the Ottenheimer Library. Additionally, UA Little Rock houses special learning facilities that include a learning resource center, art galleries, KUAR public radio station, and a campus-wide wireless network. It is classified among "R2: Doctoral Universities – High research activity".

== History ==
Established as Little Rock Junior College by the Little Rock School District in 1927, the institution became a private four-year university under the name Little Rock University in 1957. It returned to public status in 1969 when it merged with the University of Arkansas System under its present name. As of 2025, the former campus of Little Rock Junior College is used by Philander Smith University.

In 1975, UA Little Rock's William H. Bowen School of Law was established. The university also began offering graduate and professional work in 1975, and the Graduate School was created in 1977.

In 1986, the UA Little Rock public radio station KUAR went on the air.

In 2000, UA Little Rock was classified as a doctoral university/research intensive in the National Carnegie categories of institutions of higher education.

In 2002, the university celebrated its 75th anniversary.

In 2005, UA Little Rock opened its on-campus intercollegiate athletic arena, a gift from Jackson T. Stephens.

On May 2, 2012, the university dedicated its $15 million Center for Integrative Nanotechnology Sciences. The center facilitates collaboration among researchers at UA Little Rock, the University of Arkansas for Medical Sciences, the University of Arkansas, and the Food and Drug Administration’s National Center for Toxicological Research.

In 2013, UA Little Rock opened the George W. Donaghey Emerging Analytics Center to provide visual data services for regional institutions.

In January 2018, the Windgate Center of Art + Design opened. Funded by a $20.3 million gift from the Windgate Charitable Foundation, the center includes 64,000 square feet of classrooms, studios, and art galleries.

In October 2022, UA Little Rock announced the largest fundraising effort in university history ahead of its 100th anniversary in 2027. The Centennial Campaign aims to raise $250 million. As of September 2025, the university had raised $233 million.

In November 2023, UA Little Rock announced its new Trojan Guarantee scholarship that provides a tuition-free bachelor's degree to eligible first-time freshmen by covering any remaining tuition and mandatory fees after other financial aid, such as the Pell Grant and Arkansas Academic Challenge Scholarship, has been applied.

In October 2024, the university completed the multi-year Trojan Way Project that revitalized the heart of campus. Funded by an $8.5 million grant from the George W. Donaghey Foundation, the project features new lighting and landscaping, a scenic new north–south promenade, and a revitalized plaza near Ottenheimer Library.

On August 1, 2025, UA Little Rock received a $4.2 million gift from the Trinity Foundation to strengthen early childhood education in Arkansas.

During the fall 2025 semester, UA Little Rock marked the largest undergraduate enrollment increase since 2001. In fall 2025, the university enrolled 7,011 undergraduate and graduate students, up from 6,913 in fall 2024, representing a 1.4 percent increase. With the addition of students at the William H. Bowen School of Law and concurrent enrollment high school students, a total fall 2025 enrollment of about 8,000 is anticipated.

== Academics ==
Academic rankings

National
- U.S. News & World Report: 376
- Washington Monthly: 716

Global
- ARWU: 901–1000

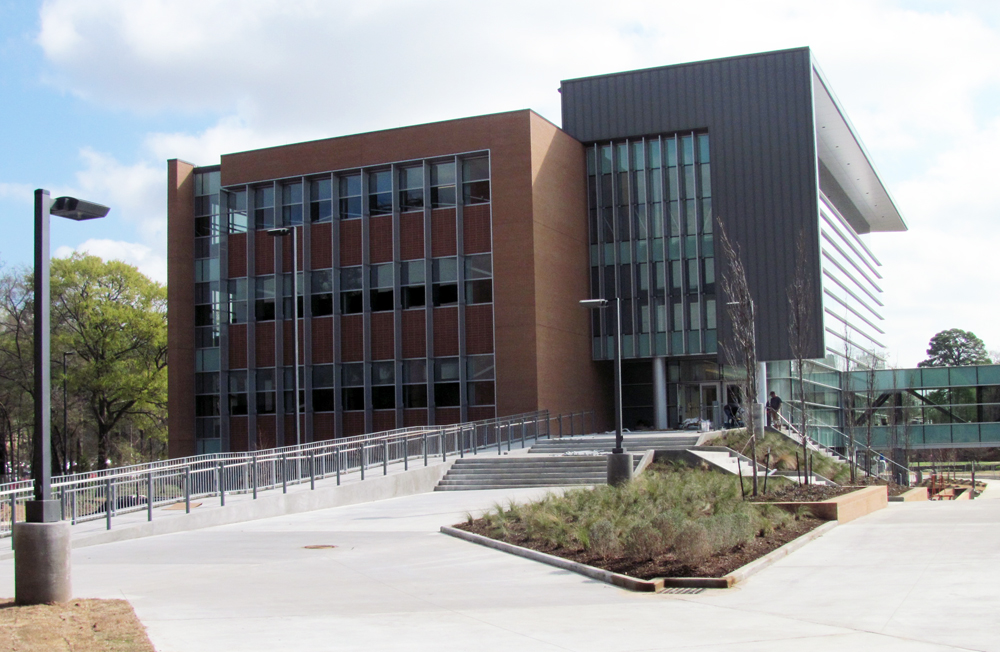
UA Little Rock Student Services Center

The university offers more than 100 undergraduate degree programs and 60 graduate degree programs including graduate certificates, master's degrees, and doctoral degrees, through both traditional and online courses. Students attend classes in one of the university's three new colleges and a law school:

- College of Business, Health, and Human Services
- College of Humanities, Arts, Social Sciences, and Education
- Donaghey College of Science, Technology, Engineering, and Mathematics
- William H. Bowen School of Law

== Student life ==
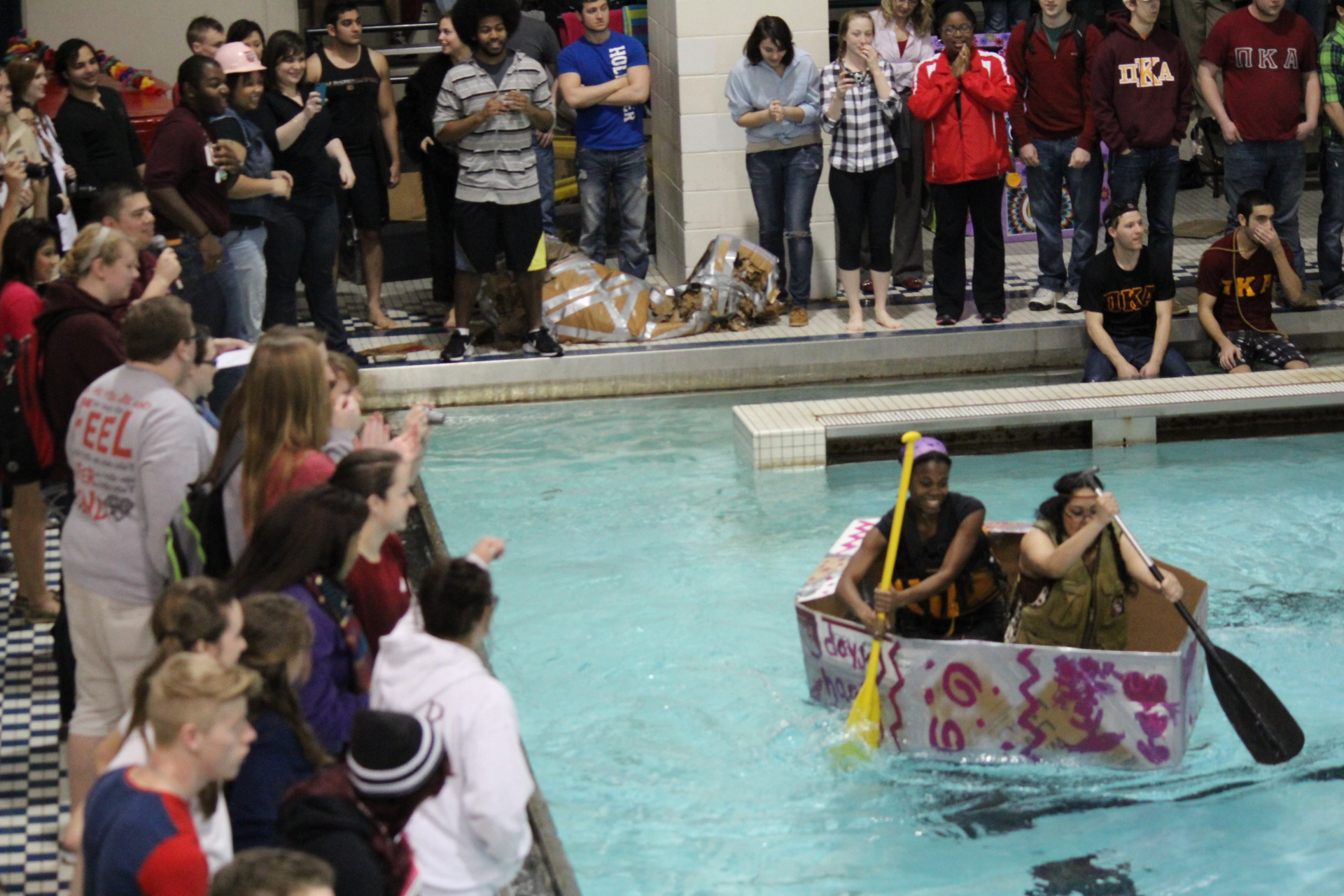
UA Little Rock homecoming boat regatta

Undergraduate demographics as of fall 2025
Race and ethnicity	Total
White	44.9%
Black	23.6%
Two or more races	8.3%
Hispanic	8.3%
International student	7.9%
Asian	2.0%
American Indian/Alaska Native	0.4%
Unknown	3.5%
Economic diversity
Low-income (Note: The percentage of students who received an income-based federal Pell grant intended for low-income students.)	48%
Affluent (Note: The percentage of students who are a part of the American middle class at the bare minimum.)	52%

The student life at UA Little Rock is typical of public universities in the United States. It is characterized by student-run organizations and affiliation groups that support social, academic, athletic, and religious activities and interests. Some of the services offered by the UA Little Rock Office of Campus Life are intramural sports and fitness programs, leadership development, peer tutoring, student government association, student support programs including groups for non-traditional and first-generation students, a student-run newspaper, and fraternity and sorority life. The proximity of the UA Little Rock campus to downtown Little Rock enables students to take advantage of a wide array of recreational, entertainment, educational, internship, and employment opportunities that are not available anywhere else in Arkansas.

=== Campus living ===
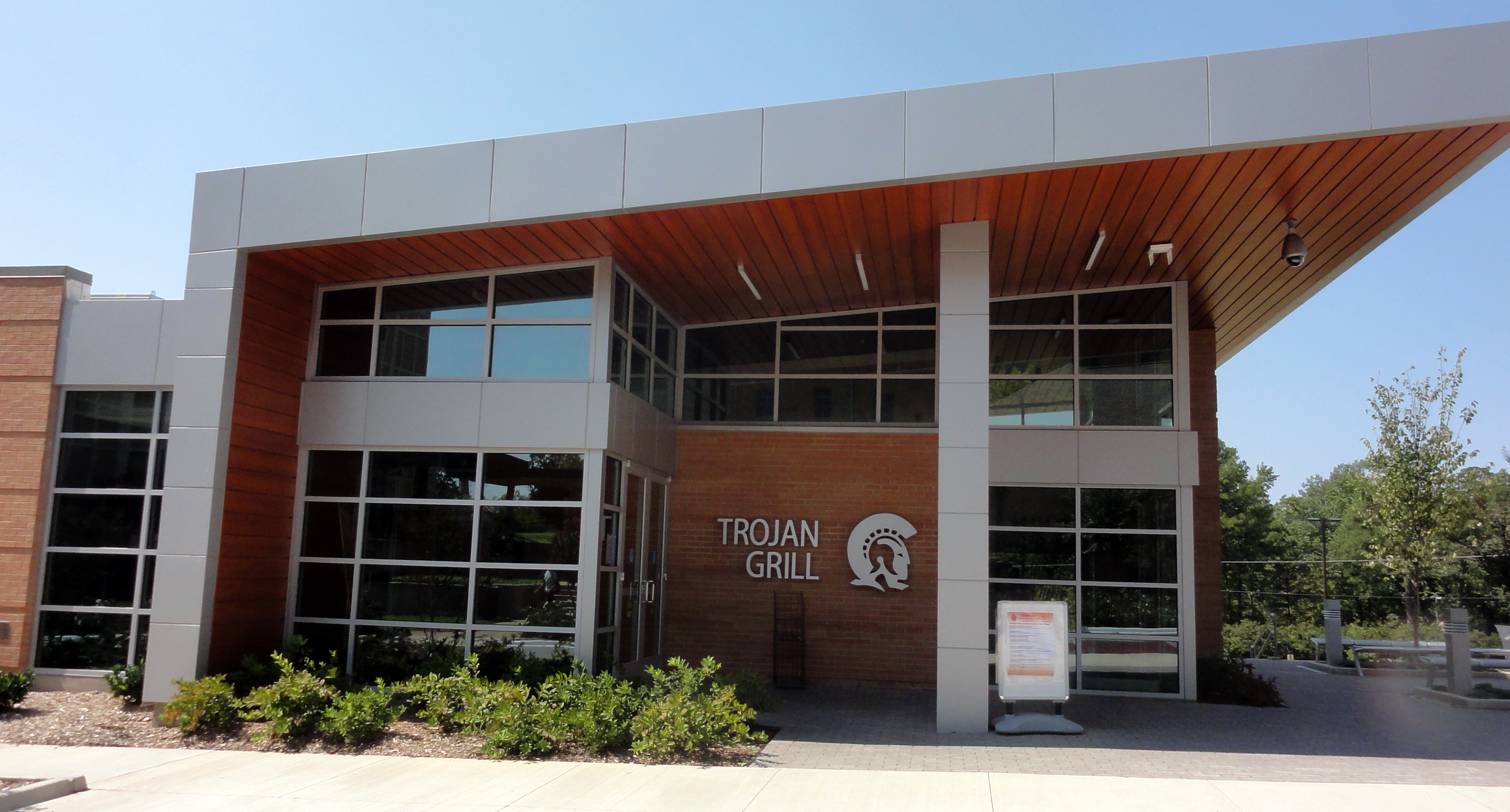
UA Little Rock Trojan Grill

UA Little Rock provides a variety of on-campus living options for students, including traditional resident rooms and multiple-bedroom apartments. The university has four residence halls on the eastern side of the campus and the University Village Apartment Complex on the southern side of campus.

On-campus housing options include private rooms, suites, apartments, and pod-style living. Some accommodations include full kitchens, laundry facilities, WiFi, a theatre, study rooms, reserved parking, and an outdoor pool.

The university also features a variety of on-campus dining options: Trojan Cafe, Hissho Sushi, Tres Habaneros, Starbucks, WOW American Eats, Common's Market, SubConnection, and Business Brew.

=== Athletics ===
UA Little Rock's 14 athletic teams are known as the Little Rock Trojans, with teams participating in the Ohio Valley Conference. Little Rock's main athletic offices are located in the Jack Stephens Center. UA Little Rock offers the following sports:

- Baseball
- Men's and women's basketball
- Men's and women's golf
- Women's volleyball
- Women's soccer
- Women's swimming/diving
- Men's and women's cross country
- Men's and women's track and field (indoor and outdoor)
- Men's wrestling

Two Little Rock teams that do not compete in the OVC are the women's swimming and diving team (Missouri Valley Conference) and wrestling (Pac-12 Conference), neither of which the OVC sponsors. Wrestling is the school's newest sport, starting in 2019, and is the first Division I program in Arkansas.

== Land and buildings ==
The university's Center for Arkansas History and Culture is located in downtown Little Rock.

== Collections and archives ==
On July 1, 2014, the UA Little Rock Collections and Archives division was created. The division encompasses:

- Ottenheimer Library
- Center for Arkansas History and Culture
- Sequoyah National Research Center

== Notable students and alumni ==
=== Arts & entertainment ===
- Julie Adams (1946) – actress (film and television) best known for her role in Creature from the Black Lagoon
- Dona Bailey (1975) – video game programmer and educator who developed Atari, Inc.'s 1981 arcade video game Centipede
- Lisa Blount – Academy Award-winning film producer and actress
- Stuart Greer – former character actor
- LaToya M. Hobbs – American painter and printmaker, artist best known for her large-scale portraits of Black women
- Mike Saunders, also known as "Metal Mike" (B.S. in accounting) – accountant, singer of the Californian punk band Angry Samoans, and rock critic who is credited with coining the music genre label "heavy metal"
- Symone (2017) – drag performer, model, and winner of Rupaul's Drag Race Season 13

=== Athletics ===
- Kris Bankston (born 1999) – basketball player in the Israeli Basketball Premier League
- Deondre Burns (born 1997) – basketball player in the Israeli Basketball Premier League
- Malik Dixon – basketball player, top scorer in the 2005 Israel Basketball Premier League
- Derek Fisher – former Los Angeles Lakers player and New York Knicks head coach
- Lis Shoshi – Kosovan-born professional basketball player
- Matt Spatafora – Canadian baseball coach
- Rayjon Tucker (2019) – professional basketball player in the NBA with Milwaukee Bucks

=== Education ===
- James E. Cofer – Ed.D. alumnus, former UA Little Rock professor, and former president of both Missouri State University and the University of Louisiana at Monroe

=== Government & civil service ===
- Camille Bennett – Arkansas House of Representatives, 2015–2017
- Karilyn Brown – Arkansas House of Representatives, 2015–present
- Matthew Brown – member of the Arkansas House of Representatives
- James Richard Cheek (1957) – U.S. ambassador to El Salvador (1979–1981), Ethiopia (1985–1988), Sudan (1989–1992) and Argentina (1993–1996)
- Charlie Daniels (attended) – Arkansas commissioner of state lands (1985–2001), Arkansas secretary of state (2002–2010), Arkansas state auditor (2011–2015)
- Denise Jones Ennett (M.A.) – politician
- Vivian Flowers (B.S. in political science) – Arkansas House of Representatives (2015–present), mayor of Pine Bluff, AR (2025–present)
- Herschel Friday
- Kevin Hern (MBA) – U.S. House of Representatives, 2018–
- Bob Johnson (bachelor's degree in political science) – Arkansas House of Representatives (1995–2001), Arkansas Senate (2001–2011), president pro tempore of Arkansas Senate (2009–2011)
- Allen Kerr (attended) – Arkansas House of Representatives (2009–2015), Arkansas Insurance Commissioner (2015–2020)
- Jim Lendall (1974 Bachelor of Arts in political science and history) – Army veteran, nurse, activist, and politician, 2010 Green Party candidate for Arkansas governor
- Fredrick Love (bachelor's degree in political science and master's degree in public administration) – politician
- Jim Nickels (JD) – politician
- Tommy F. Robinson – businessman, lobbyist, and politician
- Mike Ross (1987) – U.S. House of Representatives, 2001–2013
- Bill Sample (attended) – Arkansas House of Representatives, 2005–2010; Arkansas Senate 2011–2023
- Robert William Schroeder III (1989) – U.S. District Court, Eastern District of Texas, nominated June 2014
- Frank Scott Jr. (MBA) – mayor of Little Rock, AR (2019–present)
- Tara Shephard (M.A., 2000) – Arkansas House of Representatives (2023–)
- Vic Snyder (1988) – U.S. House of Representatives, 1997–2011
- Joy Springer (B.S., MEd) – Arkansas House of Representatives, 2020-
- James Sturch (B.S., Political Science) – Arkansas House of Representatives (2015–2019), Arkansas Senate (2019–2023)
- Joyce Williams Warren – retired judge, Arkansas's first Black female judge

=== Other ===
- Marc Perrone (attended) – labor union leader

== Notable faculty ==
- Robert Bradley – psychologist
- Carolina Cruz-Neira – Spanish-Venezuelan-American computer engineer, researcher, designer, educator, and pioneer of virtual reality (VR) who is known for inventing the cave automatic virtual environment (CAVE)
- Joycelyn Elders – pediatrician, vice admiral in the Public Health Service Commissioned Corps, and public health administrator who was the second woman, second person of color, and first African American to serve as surgeon general of the United States (1993–1994)
- Sara Alderman Murphy – civil rights activist
- Daniel R. Schwarz – professor of English literature
- A.J. Smith – American printmaker, artist, and professor at the University of Arkansas at Little Rock
- Richard Y. Wang – founder and executive director of the Chief Data Officer and Information Quality (CDOIQ) Program at the Massachusetts Institute of Technology, widely acknowledged as the "Founder of Information Quality", and tenured University Professor of Information Quality and Director of the Institute for Chief Data Officers at the University of Arkansas at Little Rock
