= Mequitta Ahuja =

American artist (born 1976)

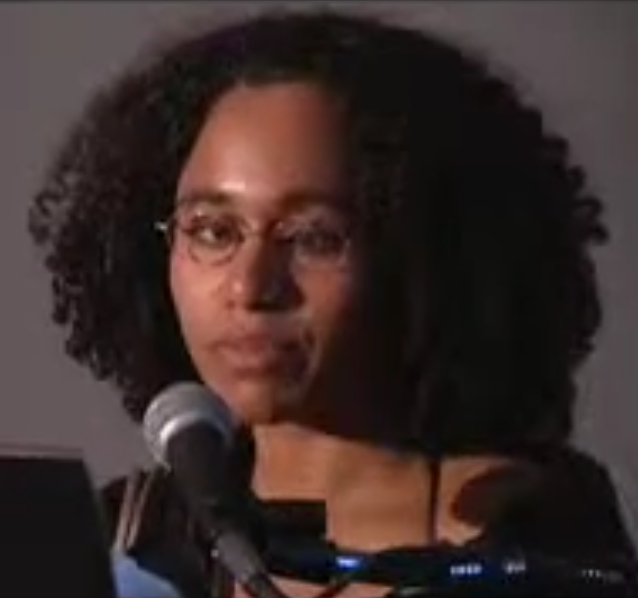
- At the Brooklyn Museum in 2007
- Born: February 3, 1976 (age 50); Grand Rapids, Michigan
- Education: Hampshire College (BA); University of Illinois at Chicago (MFA)
- Movement: Contemporary Art
- Website: MequittaAhuja.com

Mequitta Ahuja (born 1976) is a contemporary American feminist painter of African American and South Asian descent who lives in Baltimore, Maryland. Ahuja creates works of self-portraiture that combine themes of myth and legend with personal identity.

== Early life and education ==
Mequitta Ahuja was born in Grand Rapids, Michigan to an Indian father and African-American mother, hailing from New Delhi and Cincinnati respectively. Ahuja grew up in a largely white community in Connecticut, and had little contact with African American communities and culture. Her upbringing in this environment is a common subject in her work.

Ahuja received her BA at Hampshire College in Amherst, Massachusetts in 1998, and her MFA at University of Illinois at Chicago in 2003, where she was mentored by contemporary artist Kerry James Marshall.

== Career and works ==
In 2007, in Ahuja's debut exhibition in New York city, New York Times art critic Holland Cotter said of Ahuja's work, "Referring to the artist's African-American and East Indian background, the pictures turn marginality into a regal condition". Ahuja's art explores the social construction of issues such as race, gender, and identity through a technique of self-portraiture. To create her paintings, Ahuja relies on a three-step process that involves performance, photography, and drawing/painting. Ahuja begins by developing a series of performances involving costumes, props, and poses. With the aid of a remote shutter, she then photographs her performances and documents them as "non-fictional source material." Finally, she incorporates these photographs into her invented material, resulting in her completed self-portraits.

Ahuja has discussed her paintings as being feminist, referring to the assertive, self-sufficient female presence prevalent in her work, and frequently turns to her African American and South Asian roots in her consideration of identity issues. She states that through her art, "I feel I can have relationships to these groups on my own terms". In 2007, Ahuja was included in the exhibition Global Feminisms at the Brooklyn Museum of Art, and in 2009 her painting "Dream Region", reflecting her various identities, was featured as the cover of the book War Baby/Love Child: Mixed Race Asian American Art.

Ahuja appropriates ancient works of myth and legend, such as the fifteenth century Persian manuscript and Mughal miniature paintings, into her own commitment to certain kinds of identity fabrication. She articulated her own artistic style as "Of primary concern to me is the agency we have to self-invent and self-represent... creative processes that are necessarily bricolage. We draw on personal and cultural history as well as our creative imaginations". In her projects "Auto cartography I" and "Rhyme Sequence: Wiggle Waggle", the pictorial styles of the paintings are cross-cultural as well as autobiographical. Ahuja was compelled to study myths, folklore and ancient works as a way to discuss how they are represented in art. She combines her own cultural heritage with the Western art canon to explore stories and imagery related to her experience. Western art historical references are also apparent in Ahuja's work, from early Italian Renaissance paintings to impressionism and post-impressionism. Combining those Western art cannons with South Asian art traditions, Ahuja is said to "reclaim creative authorship" or agency in her self-portraiture.

Ahuja cites her work as "automythography," an expansion of feminist Audre Lorde's "biomythography." Ahuja describes "automythography" as a "combination of personal narrative with cultural and personal mythology."

Ahuja often paints over her own work, regarding failed paintings as an opportunity, which "allows for the sort of things you can't plan for." Ahuja is also interested in the process, building surfaces by painting, stamping to create a complex surface. "I'm thinking of the ground as a cultural space. Instead of starting with the plain page, I'm starting it with this layer of culture so that when I'm building my imagery, it's really a wrestle between the figure and the ground. In the end, there's this integrated, stitched together element between them. . . I'm interested in mixing those traditions: flatness of space, but also some perspectival space and depth into the surface. I think that's where we are in painting. I think we, as artists, now have free range to take what we want from history."

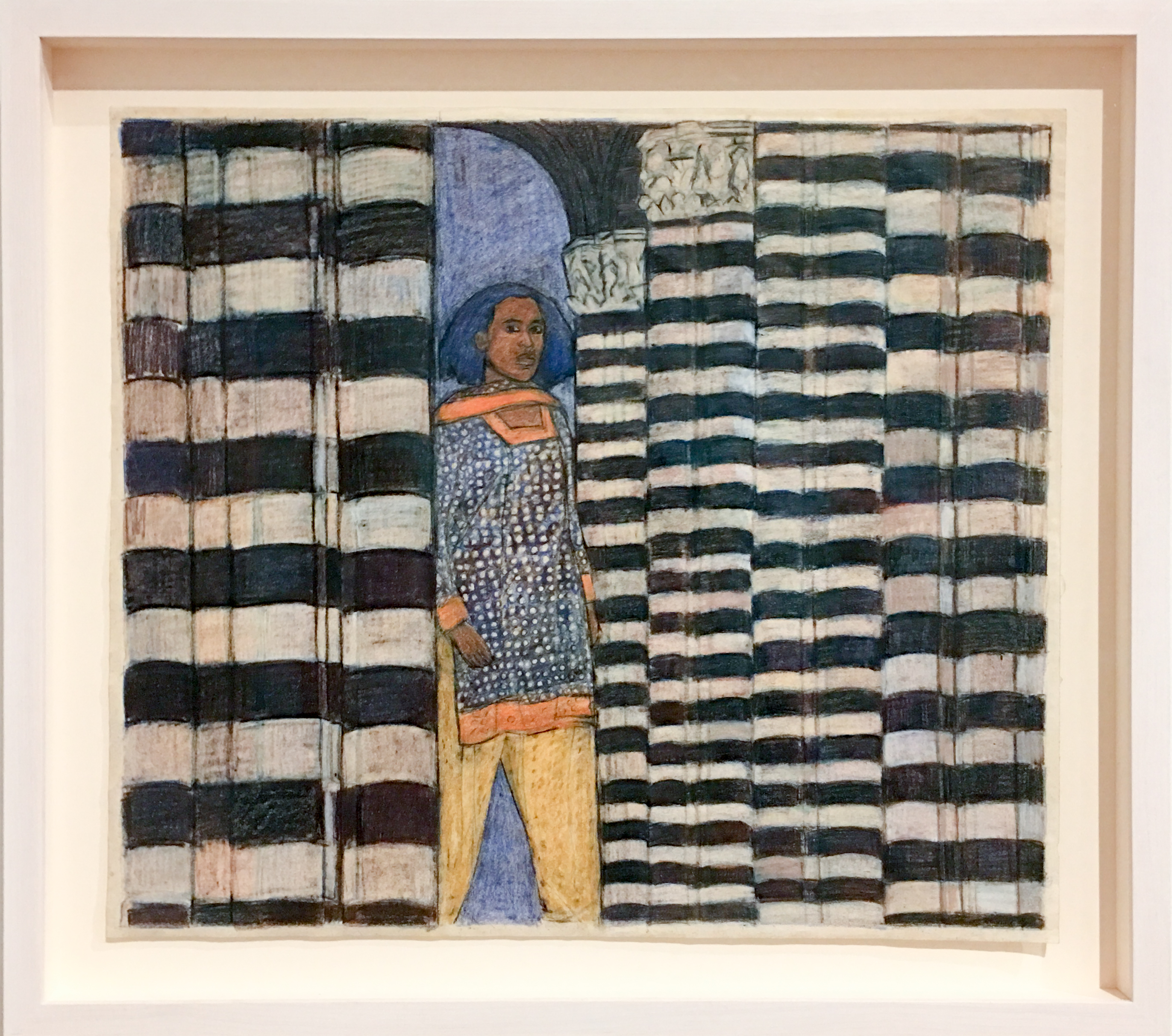
Colored pencil on paper

In 2008, Ahuja created Tress IV, with the aim to convert the image of African American hair to a "space of infinite creative possibilities or generative possibilities." Ahuja believes that African American hair is often weighted down with "personal and cultural history." By exaggerating the image of African American hair, it shows the value that hair has in the lives of black people and how they are constantly evolving the standard of beauty, moving away from a more Eurocentric to Afrocentric idea of beauty. Her two central concerns during this period were "self-invention and self-representation."

Ahuja's work has been exhibited throughout the United States as well as in Paris, Brussels, Berlin, India, Dubai, and Milan. In 2010, Ahuja was profiled as an "Artist to Watch" in the February edition of ARTnews, and over the years she has been the recipient of multiple awards for her art, including the Tiffany Foundation Award in 2011, and a 2009 Joan Mitchell Grant. In 2018 she was awarded a Guggenheim Fellowship from the John Simon Guggenheim Memorial Foundation, which has been helping select artists expand their practice for nearly a century.

Mequitta Ahuja's work has been exhibited in numerous prestigious institutions, including the Smithsonian National Portrait Gallery, highlighting her influence in contemporary portraiture.

== Exhibitions ==
Early in her career, Ahuja's exhibition, Myth and Memory: Dancing on the Hide of Shere Khan, was featured in MCA Chicago's UBS 12X12: New Artists/New Work, in November 2005. As with much of her work, the exhibition dealt with human identity, informed by her own experience as a multiracial woman.

In 2008 Ahuja opened her solo exhibition, Flowback, at the Lawndale Art Center in Houston, Texas. Flowback dealt with the varying relationships between black women and their hair, through textured and patterned crayon drawings of black women's hair flowing out from their tilted back heads. The show also included a piece titled Loop, in which two women's hair is woven together in a net of straight and curly locks, with highlights and bursts of light.

Ahuja was not new to solo exhibitions in 2008. She had a solo show at BravinLee programs in New York, titled Encounters, in the spring of 2007. In 2009 she brought a new body of work to BravinLee Programs, this one titled Automythography I. During this time, Ahuja was ranked a finalist in the 2009 Outwin Boochever Portrait Competition at the Smithsonian National Portrait Gallery in Washington, DC. The portrait she submitted, titled Repunzel, features the upended head of a black woman with curly hair flowing downward and severed into sections by two thin white lines. The piece was drawn in waxy chalk on paper by Ahuja in 2008, the same year as her Flowback solo exhibition.

Following the exhibition of Automythography I, Ahuja brought a show she called Automythography II to Arthouse at The Jones Center in Austin, TX. The show ran from October 24, 2009 through January 2, 2010. Not long after that, Ajuha gained representation in Europe at Galerie Nathalie Obadia, in Paris, France, with a show that began in April 2010. Later in 2010, Ahuja was an artist in residence at The Studio Museum in Harlem, located in New York city. The residency culminated in the exhibition, Usable Pasts, which ran from July to October. Ahuja's mythic self-portrait, Generator, was featured. In it Ahuja appears as a goddess in pink robes.

Ahuja's work continued to show in group exhibitions throughout 2011 and 2012, appearing twice with Galerie Nathalie Obadiah in Brussels, beginning with the 2011 Armory Show. November 2012 and into the following year Portraiture Now: Drawing on the Edge ran at the Smithsonian National Portrait Gallery in Washington, DC, including Ahuja as one of the featured artists. In 2013 Ahuja exhibited at Thierry Goldbery, in New York, NY.

In 2014 Ahuja was selected by Crystal Bridges Museum of American Art to be one of the emerging artists from across the United States featured in their exhibition State of the Art: Discovering American Art Now. The exhibition is the result of a 2013 road trip the museum's curatorial team took to research American art of the time by visiting over 1,000 artists in their studios, conducting interviews and selecting around 100 diverse artists to present their unique American perspectives in the final exhibition. The exhibition was later shared with other arts institutions, such as Minneapolis Institute of Art, Minneapolis, MN in 2016, and Telfair Museums Jepson Center. In the same year, the Minneapolis Institute of Art included Ahuja's work in another show, Marks of Genius: One Hundred Extraordinary Drawings.

Feeling isolated and seeking a way to participate and connect in the art world, Ahuja applied for the 2015 Sondheim Artscape Prize, and became a finalist, competing for a $25,000 fellowship and exhibiting work at the Baltimore Museum of Art in Maryland. While she did not receive the prize, her participation in the exhibition led to new friendships and acted as a catalyst to continue pursuing arts fellowships. She would become a finalist for the Sondheim Prize again in 2017, and receive the Guggenheim Fellowship in 2018.

Ahuja participated in several more exhibitions through 2015 and 2016, including shows at Tiwani Contemporary in London, England, Baltimore Museum of Art in Maryland, Grand Rapids Art Museum in Michigan, and Silber Gallery at Goucher College in Towson, MD. The Tiwani Contemporary exhibition, titled Mythopoeia, brought together four artists from around the world to explore the theme of myth-making in art as a means of understanding our world and elevating culture. For this exhibition, Ahuja unveiled a new series of self-portraits as "The Journeyman", which used her characteristic "automythography" to explore the artist as both archetype and individual.

Ahuja participated in the 2016 show Champagne Life at Saatchi Gallery, in London, England. The show was criticized by some for its superficial feminism and lack of cohesiveness beyond having all female artists, though the artwork itself was lauded for its high quality.

In 2017 Ahuja's work was part of a number of exhibitions, including Lucid Dreams and Distant Visions at the Asia Society in New York, which explored work by artists of the South Asian diaspora. State of the Art: Discovering American Art Now at Dixon Gallery and Gardens in Memphis, Tennessee also featured Ahuja's work in 2017, along with Shifting: African-American Women Artists and the Power of their Gaze at the University of Maryland's David C. Driskell Center, The Reflection in the Sword of Holofernes at the Galveston Artist Residency in Galveston, Texas, which focused on "speaking your truth in the most direct way you know how," and State of the Art: Discovering American Art Now at the Frist Center for the Visual Arts in Nashville, Tennessee.

Ahuja's Xpect premiered in 2020 in Riffs and Relations: African American Artists and the European Modernist Tradition at The Phillips Collection. A study for the work was subsequently acquired by the museum.

In 2021, Ahuja was one of four featured artists in the exhibition All Due Respect at the Baltimore Museum of Art, along with LaToya M. Hobbs, Lauren Frances Adams, and Cindy Cheng. Ahuja's work in this exhibition explore themes of grief and care.

Her paintings often explore themes of identity, history, and self-representation, drawing from both personal experience and broader cultural narratives.

Ahuja has received several notable awards, including a Joan Mitchell Foundation Grant, which recognizes exceptional talent in the visual arts.

== Selected collections ==
- Minneapolis Institute of Art, Minneapolis, MN
- The Phillips Collection, Washington, D.C.
