= Charles Blake (politician) =

American politician

Minority Leader of the Arkansas House of Representatives
- In office January 14, 2019 – May 16, 2019
- Preceded by: David Whitaker
- Succeeded by: Fredrick Love

Member of the Arkansas House of Representatives from the 36th district
- In office January 2015 – May 16, 2019
- Preceded by: Darrin Williams
- Succeeded by: Denise Ennett

Personal details
- Born: Charles Jamaal Blake Little Rock, Arkansas, U.S.
- Party: Democratic
- Children: 5
- Education: Grinnell College (BA)

Charles Jamaal Blake is an American Democratic politician who represented the 36th district in the Arkansas House of Representatives from 2015 to 2019. The district contains a portion of Little Rock and is entirely contained in Pulaski County. Blake resigned in 2019 to work for Little Rock's mayor, being replaced by Denise Jones Ennett in a special election.

Arkansas House of Representatives
Preceded by Darrin Williams	Member of the Arkansas House of Representatives from the 36th district 2015–2019	Succeeded by Denise Ennett
Preceded by David Whitaker	Minority Leader of the Arkansas House of Representatives; 2019	Succeeded by Fredrick Love
