= Marsh Davis =

American politician

Member of the Arkansas House of Representatives from the 61st district
- In office January 14, 2019 – January 9, 2023
- Preceded by: Scott Baltz
- Succeeded by: Jeremiah Moore

Personal details
- Born: Clifford Marshall Davis Memphis, Tennessee, U.S.
- Party: Republican
- Children: 2
- Education: Arkansas State University (BS); University of Arkansas (PharmD)

Clifford Marshall "Marsh" Davis is an American politician and pharmacist who served as a member of the Arkansas House of Representatives for the 61st district from 2019 to 2023.

== Early life and education ==
Davis was born in Memphis, Tennessee and raised in Cherokee Village, Arkansas. He earned a Bachelor of Science degree in zoology from Arkansas State University and a Doctor of Pharmacy from the University of Arkansas for Medical Sciences.

== Career ==
Outside of politics, Davis works as a pharmacist for Walgreens. He was elected to the Arkansas House of Representatives in November 2018 and assumed office on January 14, 2019. He serves as the chair of the House Subcommittee on Human Services and previously served as chair of the House Subcommittee on Juvenile Justice and Child Support.
