= Tracy Pennartz =

American politician

Member of the Arkansas House of Representatives from the 65th district
- In office January 8, 2007 – January 14, 2013
- Preceded by: Buddy Blair
- Succeeded by: Tommy Thompson

Personal details
- Party: Democratic

Tracy Pennartz is an American politician who served in the Arkansas House of Representatives from the 65th district from 2007 to 2013.
