= 2026 Arkansas gubernatorial election =

- November 3, 2026
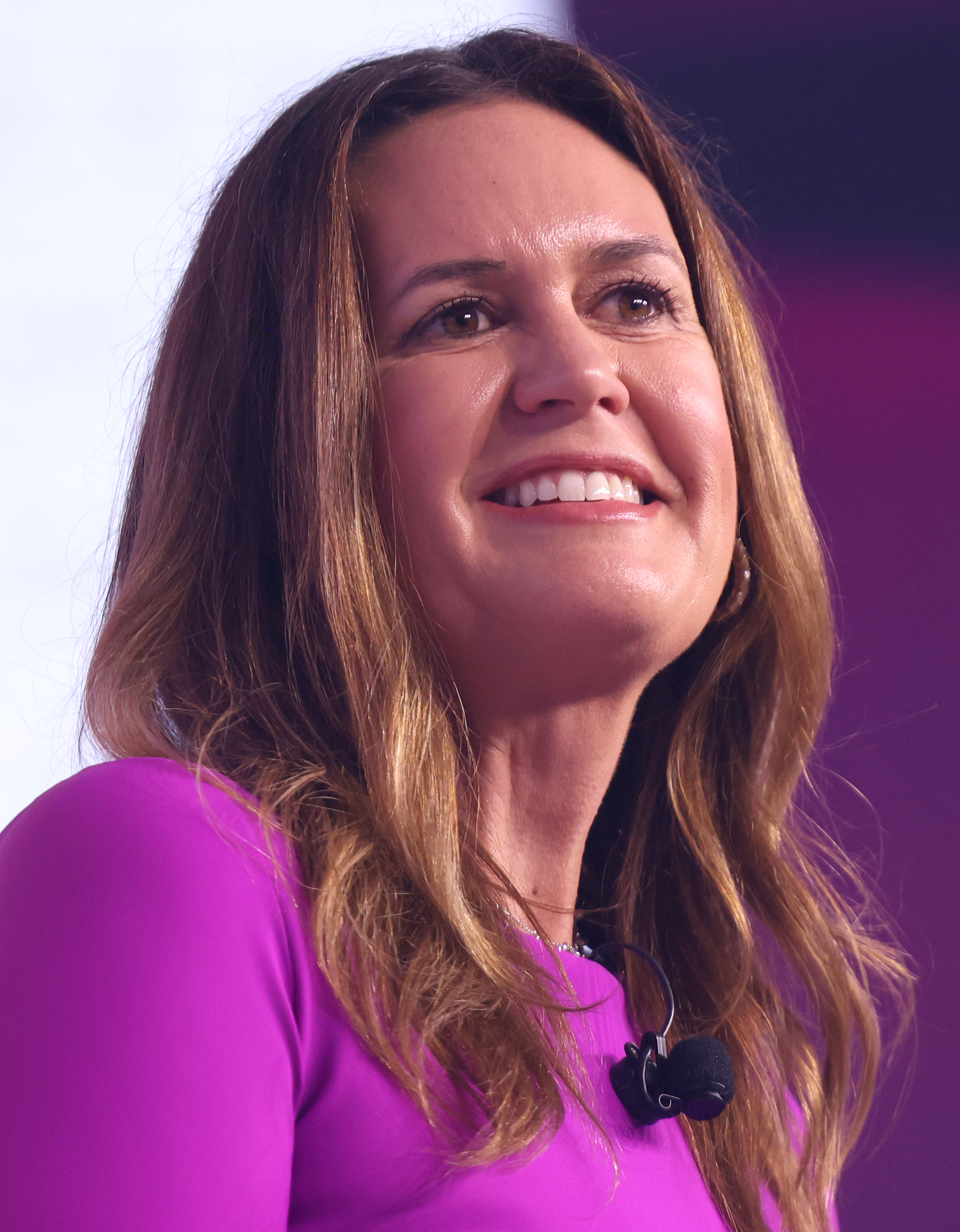

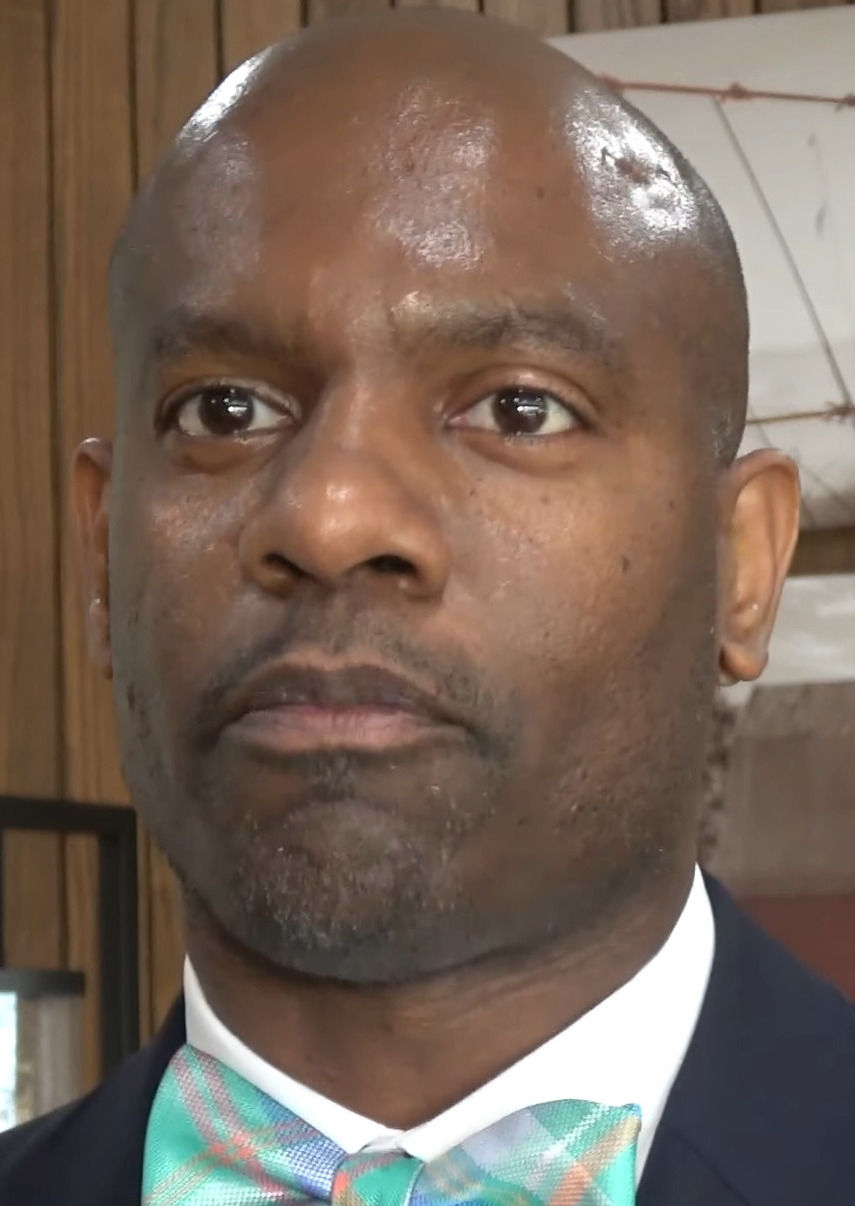

Candidate	Sarah Huckabee Sanders	Fredrick Love	Colt Shelby
Party	Republican	Democratic	Libertarian
Popular vote	477,996	343,057	67,025
Percentage	53.82%	38.63%	7.55%
- Sanders: 40–50% 50–60% 60–70% 70–80% Love: 50–60% 60–70% Shelby: 40–50%
Governor before election
Sarah Huckabee Sanders
Republican
Elected Governor
Sarah Huckabee Sanders
Republican

The 2026 Arkansas gubernatorial election was held on November 3, 2026, to elect the governor of Arkansas. Republican incumbent Sarah Huckabee Sanders was re-elected to second term. She was challenged by Democratic state senator Fredrick Love and Libertarian Colt Shelby.

Primary elections took place on March 3, 2026. Huckabee Sanders secured the Republican nomination unopposed. Love defeated businesswoman Supha Xayprasith-Mays in the Democratic primary with 81.0% of the vote.

Colt Shelby became the first third-party gubernatorial candidate since 1896 to win a plurality of the vote in an Arkansan county in his home county of Franklin.

== Republican primary ==
=== Candidates ===
==== Nominee ====
- Sarah Huckabee Sanders, incumbent governor (2023–present)

=== Endorsements ===
Sarah Huckabee Sanders

Executive branch officials

- Donald Trump, president of the United States (2017–2021, 2025–present)

Organizations

- Maggie's List

== Democratic primary ==
=== Candidates ===
==== Nominee ====
- Fredrick Love, state senator from SD-15 (2023–present)

==== Eliminated in primary ====
- Supha Xayprasith-Mays, businesswoman and candidate for governor in 2022

=== Results ===
Results by county Love: 60–70%; 70–80%; 80–90%; 90–100%

Democratic primary results
Party	Candidate	Votes	%
Democratic	Fredrick Love	104,725	81.0
Democratic	Supha Xayprasith-Mays	24,520	19.0
Total votes		129,245	100.0

== Libertarian primary ==
=== Candidates ===
==== Nominee ====
- Colt Shelby, farmer

== General election ==
=== Predictions ===
Source	Ranking	As of
The Cook Political Report	Solid R	October 29, 2026
Decision Desk HQ	Safe R	November 3, 2026
Fox News	Solid R	November 1, 2026
Inside Elections	Solid R	October 29, 2026
NBC News	Solid R	November 3, 2026
RealClearPolitics	Solid R	November 1, 2026
Sabato's Crystal Ball	Safe R	November 2, 2026
Silver Bulletin	Solid R	November 3, 2026

=== Polling ===
Poll source	Date(s) administered	Sample size (Note: Key: A – all adults RV – registered voters LV – likely voters V – unclear)	Margin of error	Sarah Huckabee Sanders (R)	Fredrick Love (D)	Colt Shelby (L)	Undecided
Hendrix College (Note: Poll sponsored by Talk Business & Politics)	October 8–13, 2026	709 (LV)	± 5.0%	51%	32%	11%	6%
Hendrix College	August 11–12, 2026	1,217 (LV)	± 4.7%	45%	40%	7%	8%

=== Results ===
2026 Arkansas gubernatorial election
Party	Candidate	Votes	%
Republican	Sarah Huckabee Sanders	477,996	53.82
Democratic	Fredrick Love	343,057	38.63
Libertarian	Colt Shelby	67,025	7.55
Write-in			
Total votes		888,078	100.0
Republican hold			

==== Counties that flipped from Republican to Democratic ====
- Desha (largest city: Dumas)
- Crittenden (largest city: West Memphis)

==== Counties that flipped from Republican to Libertarian ====
- Franklin (largest city: Ozark)

==== By congressional district ====
Sanders won all four congressional districts.

District	Love	Sanders	Representative
1st	31.36%	61.13%	Rick Crawford
2nd	44.62%	48.19%	French Hill
3rd	42.93%	50.93%	Steve Womack
4th	32.91%	57.19%	Bruce Westerman

== See also ==
- 2026 United States elections
- 2026 Arkansas elections
- 2026 United States Senate election in Arkansas
- 2026 Arkansas Senate election
- 2026 Arkansas House of Representatives election

== Notes ==
Partisan clients
