= LaToya M. Hobbs =

American painter and printmaker

- Born: Little Rock, Arkansas
- Education: Purdue University, (MFA, 2013); University of Arkansas at Little Rock (BA, 2009)
- Awards: 2020 Janet & Walter Sondheim Artscape Prize (2020); Artist in Residence at Joan Mitchell Center (2020); Artist Travel Grant, Municipal Art Society of Baltimore (2019)
- Website: latoyamhobbs.com

LaToya M. Hobbs is an American painter and printmaker best known for her large-scale portraits of Black women. She was born and raised in Little Rock, Arkansas. She earned her BA from the University of Arkansas at Little Rock and her MFA from Purdue University. Hobbs moved to Baltimore, Maryland later in her life, where she works as a professor at the Maryland Institute College of Art. She gained recognition for her portraiture and figurative imagery in the 2010s, receiving several travel grants and awards.

== Early life and education ==
Hobbs spent most of her early life in Little Rock, Arkansas. She attended North Little Rock High School. In her church during her youth she sang in choir and performed liturgical dance. She studied biology at the University of Arkansas until she realized that painting was her true calling. At that time she switched paths and schools to study studio art. Hobbs graduated from the University of Arkansas at Little Rock with a BA in painting, where she was mentored in printmaking by Delita Martin and AJ Smith. She later earned her MFA in studio art: painting and printmaking from Purdue University. After her education, Hobbs moved to Maryland to take a teaching position at the Maryland Institute College of Art (MICA).

== Career ==
Hobbs works as a full-time professor at MICA. She paints and creates her work in her home studio. In 2019, she had a solo exhibition titled Salt of the Earth II at Baltimore City Hall. Her work was also showcased in From Baltimore, With Love, a group exhibition with Mary Deacon Opasik, Oletha deVane, Jessica Devilbliss at Brentwood Arts Exchange, Brentwood, in 2019, curated by Schroeder Cherry. She gained recognition in 2020 as a finalist and then winner of the Janet & Walter Sondheim Artscape Prize given in Baltimore, which comes with a $25,000 prize.

In 2021, Hobbs was featured with Mequitta Ahuja, Lauren Frances Adams, and Cindy Cheng in the exhibition All Due Respect at the Baltimore Museum of Art. The exhibition features five, fifteen-foot long scenes carved from wood titled "Carving Out Time."

A time-lapse video of Hobbs creating a print was featured in the 2025 exhibition Elizabeth Catlett: A Black Revolutionary Artist. The print is a portrait of Catlett's granddaughter Naima Mora.

== Influences ==
Hobbs draws inspiration from numerous influences that shape her distinctive style. She is influenced by the works of artists such as Elizabeth Catlett. Her work "Carving Out Time" includes deliberate references to other artists who influence and inspire her: Catlett, Alma Thomas, Valerie Maynard, and Kerry James Marshall. Hobbs explores themes of identity, womanhood, and African American history through her art. She draws from the boldness of Walker's silhouette work, the storytelling of Ringgold's quilts, and the sculptural forms of Catlett's figures, to create art that reflects a deep engagement with both historical and contemporary narratives.

== Work ==
Hobbs is best known for her portraiture, which has a characteristic appearance. Her prints and paintings typically feature texture, color, and bold patterns. She is a multimedia artist, expressing herself through linoleum woodcuts, printmaking, and painting. Often starting her large portraits with a photograph, she builds on that foundation by carefully using a tool to etch her creative visions into the wood canvas. She uses bold colors and intricate patterns, connected to African cultural practices.

Hobbs's pieces typically consist of depicting images of Black perspectives of culture, womanhood, and family, front and center. In doing this, she challenges stereotypes of preconceived notions about Black women and the Black community, and illustrates the layered complexities of the two. She aims to capture the essence and beauty of Black women's bodies. Hobbs's artistic practice involves intense observation, and she uses her work as an opportunity to capture the likenesses of real people, in order that they be observed by the public. By painting her personal life through family and friends, she helps to insert more Black representation in Western art history and creates a legacy where the presence and power of Black people are acknowledged.

== Black Women of Print Arts Group ==
Hobbs is a founding member of the group Black Women of Print (BWoP), which is a group who focus on making works of Black women printmakers, both in history and present, more noticeable to the public eye.

== Personal life ==
Hobbs is married and has two sons with her husband, artist Ariston Jacks. She often emphasizes the importance of her family in her life, to the point where she, for a period of time, put her artistic career on the back burner in order to prioritize them during the pandemic. She along with her husband homeschools their children as a means to better balance her career while customizing their children’s education plans to their specific needs.

== Legacy ==
Hobbs's art offers insight on Blackness, especially her representations of Black womanhood and identity. She creates figures and imagery that expresses themes of motherhood, sisterhood, spirituality, and cultural identity. She often depicts her family and those close to her in her art to represent these themes and narratives in her life, connecting them to the larger Black diasporic community. Through her work she challenges steryotpes and celebrates the strength of Black women, advocating for change in the issues surrounding race, gender, and representation. By intertwining personal narratives to symbolize broader culture themes she creates a space that fosters a deeper understanding of the complexities of Black identity and the eternal legacy of Black women.

== Selected solo exhibitions ==
- Currents 39: LaToya M. Hobbs, Carving Out Time, Milwaukee Art Museum, Milwaukee, WI, 2024
- Flourish, Virginia Museum of Contemporary Art, Virginia Beach, VA, 2023
- Salt of the Earth II, Baltimore City Hall Galleries, Baltimore, MD, 2019
- Salt of the Earth, Community Folk Arts Center, Syracuse University, Syracuse, NY, 2018
- Sitting Pretty, Rosenberg Gallery, Goucher College, Towson, MD, 2018
- Beautiful Uprising, University of Wisconsin-Marinette, Marinette, WI, 2016
- Oshun: LaToya M. Hobbs, African American Museum, Dallas, TX, 2015
- Beautiful Uprising, Patty and Rusty Rueff Galleries, Purdue University, West Lafayette, IN, 2013
- Beautiful Uprising, Hearne Fine Art, Little Rock, AR, 2013
- Recent Work by LaToya M. Hobbs, University Plaza, West Lafayette, IN, 2012
- Duafe, Purdue University Black Cultural Center, West Lafayette, IN, 2011
- Beauty and Identity, Mullins Library Gallery University of Arkansas, Fayetteville, AR, 2011
- Women of Color, Spectrum Gallery, Lafayette, IN, 2011
