= Tommy Thompson (Arkansas politician) =

American politician

Member of the Arkansas House of Representatives from the 65th< district
- In office January 14, 2013 – January 2015
- Preceded by: Tracy Pennartz
- Succeeded by: Rick Beck

Member of the Arkansas House of Representatives from the 60th district
- In office January 2011 – January 14, 2013
- Preceded by: Johnny Hoyt
- Succeeded by: James Ratliff

Personal details
- Party: Democratic
- Education: University of Arkansas (BS, MS)

Tommy Thompson is an American politician who served as a member of the Arkansas House of Representatives for the 65th district from 2013 to 2015. Thompson first represented the 60th district from January 2011 until January 14, 2013.

== Education ==
Thompson earned his Bachelor of Science degree in agriculture and a Master of Science in adult education from the University of Arkansas.

== Elections ==
- 2014: Thompson was unseated in his bid for a third term in the November 4 general election by the Republican Rick Beck, an electrical engineer from Conway County. The district also includes Perry County.
- 2012: Redistricted to the 65th district, and with incumbent Tracy Pennartz running for Arkansas Senate, Thompson was unopposed in the May 22, 2012 Democratic primary. He won the November 6, 2012 general election with 5,858 votes (57.0%) against Republican nominee Jeff Croswell.
- 2010: When 60th district Representative Johnny Hoyt ran for the Arkansas Senate and left the seat open, Thompson won the May 18, 2010 Democratic primary with 2,921 votes (66.5%), and won the November 2, 2010 general election with 4,438 votes (54.4%) against Republican nominee Brent Murphy.
