= James Ratliff =

American politician

Member of the Arkansas House of Representatives from the 60th district
- In office January 14, 2013 – January 2017
- Preceded by: Tommy Thompson
- Succeeded by: Frances Cavenaugh

Member of the Arkansas House of Representatives from the 73rd district
- In office January 2011 – January 14, 2013
- Preceded by: J. R. Rogers
- Succeeded by: John Catlett

Personal details
- Party: Democratic
- Education: University of Arkansas

James Ratliff is an American politician and a former Democratic member of the Arkansas House of Representatives. Ratliff represented District 60 between January 2013-January 2017 and District 73 from January 2011 until January 14, 2013.

In the November 4, 2014, general election Ratliff won reelection by 49 votes over the Republican Blaine Davis. Ratliff polled 3,998 votes; Davis, 3,949.

== Education ==
Ratliff earned his bachelor's degree and master's degree from the University of Arkansas.

== Elections ==
- 2012 Redistricted to District 60, and with incumbent Tommy Thompson redistricted to District 65, Ratliff was unopposed for the May 22, 2012 Democratic Primary and won the November 6, 2012 General election with 5,151 votes (52.8%) against Republican nominee Ronald Cavenaugh, who been his runoff opponent in 2010.
- 2002 When District 73 incumbent Representative Booker Clemmons was redistricted to District 16, Ratliff ran in the 2002 Democratic Primary but lost to Representative Don House (redistricted from District 78) who won the November 5, 2002 General election.
- 2004 When Representative House left the Legislature and left the seat open, Ratliff ran in the 2004 Democratic Primary, but lost to J. R. Rogers who won the November 2, 2004 General election.
- 2010 When Representative Rogers left the Legislature and left the seat open, Ratliff placed first in the three-way May 18, 2010 Democratic Primary with 2,352 votes (43.3%), won the June 8 runoff election with 2,562 votes (52.6%), and won the November 2, 2010 General election with 3,865 votes (57.0%) against Republican nominee Chad Moseley, who had run for the seat in 2006 and 2008.

Preceded by Tommy Thompson (redistricted to District 65)	Arkansas State Representative from District 60; 2013–2016	Succeeded by Frances Cavenaugh
Preceded by J. R. Rogers	Arkansas State Representative from District 73; 2011–2013	Succeeded by John Catlett
