= Pam Adcock =

Arkansas politician

Member of the Arkansas House of Representatives from the 35th district
- In office January 10, 2005 – January 10, 2011
- Preceded by: Jim Lendall
- Succeeded by: Fredrick Love

Personal details
- Party: Democratic

Pam Adcock is an American politician. She is a former member of the Arkansas House of Representatives for District 35 in Little Rock, Arkansas, where she served several terms beginning in 2005 and ending in 2011. A Democrat, she lives in Little Rock, Arkansas. She served as Assistant Speaker Pro Tempore in 2009.

In 2014, Adcock served as the leader of the Southwest United for Progress neighborhood group in Little Rock.

In 2009, she co-sponsored an animal cruelty bill, which broadened protections for dogs, cats, and horses. In 2015, she expressed support for a proposed ban on chewing tobacco on the Arkansas House floor.
