= John Catlett =

American politician

Member of the Arkansas House of Representatives from the 73rd district
- In office January 14, 2013 – January 2015
- Preceded by: James Ratliff
- Succeeded by: Mary Bentley

Member of the Arkansas House of Representatives from the 61st district
- In office January 2011 – January 14, 2013
- Preceded by: Nathan George
- Succeeded by: Scott Baltz

Personal details
- Party: Democratic
- Education: Arkansas Tech University
- Website: johncatlett.com

John Wayne Catlett is an American politician and a Democratic former member of the Arkansas House of Representatives for District 73 from 2013 to 2015. Catlett also served from January 2011 until January 14, 2013, in the District 61 seat.

He was defeated for reelection in the November 4, 2014 general election by the Republican Mary Bentley of Perryville.

== Education ==
Catlett earned his bachelor's degree in history and political science from Arkansas Tech University.

== Elections ==
In 2010, after District 61 Representative Nathan George left the legislature, Catlett won the May 18, 2010 Democratic Primary with 2,118 votes (57 percent), and won the November 2, 2010 general election by 34 votes with 3,278 votes (50.2%) against Republican nominee Kelly Boyd.

In 2012, Catlett was redistricted to District 73, and with Representative James Ratliff redistricted to District 60, Catlett was unopposed for the May 22, 2012 Democratic Primary and won the November 6, 2012 general election with 4,088 votes (52.2%) against Republican nominee Mary Bentley. Bentley ran again in 2014 and unseated Catlett with 3,588 (51.4%) votes to his 3,392 (48.5%).
