= Mary Bentley (politician) =

American politician

Mary Elizabeth Bentley

Member of the Arkansas House of Representatives from the 54th district
- Incumbent
- Assumed office January 9, 2023
- Preceded by: Johnny Rye

Member of the Arkansas House of Representatives from the 73rd district
- In office January 12, 2015 – January 9, 2023
- Preceded by: John Catlett
- Succeeded by: Andrew Collins (redistricting)

Personal details
- Born: December 26, 1961 (age 64) Massachusetts
- Party: Republican
- Spouse: Divorced
- Children: 3
- Education: Harding University
- Occupation: Businesswoman

Mary Elizabeth Bentley (born December 26, 1961) is a businesswoman from Perryville, Arkansas, who is a Republican member of the Arkansas House of Representatives for District 73, which encompasses parts of Yell, Pope, Perry, and Conway counties in the central portion of her state.

On March 16, 2021, Bentley introduced House Bill 1749 which sought to provide safeguards for teachers who address students by other than their preferred name or pronouns. She argued in support of the bill by saying, "It's helping those professors and teachers in our schools that do not want to be sued for not using a certain person's pronoun." Human rights advocates said that the bill targeted transgender people.

In 2021, she sponsored legislation to allow the teaching of the pseudoscientific religious theory of creationism in public schools.

Preceded by John Catlett	Arkansas State Representative for District 73 (Yell, Pope, Perry, and Conway counties); 2015–	Succeeded by Incumbent
