= Denise Jones Ennett =

American politician

Member of the Arkansas House of Representatives from the 80th district
- Incumbent
- Assumed office January 9, 2023
- Preceded by: Charlene Fite

Member of the Arkansas House of Representatives from the 36th district
- In office September 2019 – January 9, 2023
- Preceded by: Charles Blake
- Succeeded by: Johnny Rye (redistricting)

Personal details
- Party: Democratic
- Education: University of Texas at Arlington (BA); University of Arkansas Little Rock (MA)

Denise Jones Ennett is an American politician. She is a Democrat currently serving as a member of the Arkansas House of Representatives from the 36th district, having assumed office in 2019 after winning a special election.

== Career ==
=== Arkansas House of Representatives ===
Ennett was first elected in a 2019 special election following the resignation of Charles Blake to work for the mayor of Little Rock, beating Darrell Stephens in a runoff election. She serves on the House Public Transportation Committee as well as the House Committee on Agriculture, Forestry and Economic Development and the Joint Committee on Advanced Communications and Information Technology.

==== Feminine hygiene products ====
In January 2021, Ennett co-sponsored a bill that would exempt items such as tampons, menstrual cups, and other products related to feminine hygiene from sales and use taxes in Arkansas. Ennett also sponsored a bill that allowed Arkansas public schools to use their funding to purchase feminine hygiene products and distribute them to students at no cost. The latter bill was approved and signed into law.

==== Discrimination against disabled people ====
Ennett co-sponsored a bill that was termed "Lila's law", after a girl who was denied a heart transplant in 2018 due to her having Down syndrome. The bill prohibited discrimination against people with disabilities when seeking an organ transplant, and was signed in to law on April 22, 2021.

==== Black Lives Matter protest ====
In June 2020, Ennett attended a Black Lives Matter protest in Little Rock, Arkansas, during the fifth consecutive night of protests in front of the Arkansas State Capitol. Ennett told reporters that she felt that she had to protest to ensure the well-being of her children.

== Personal life ==
Ennett is married to a veteran of the United States Air Force, and has three children. They live in Little Rock.

== Electoral history ==
=== 2020 ===
2020 Arkansas House of Representatives election, district 36
Primary election
Party	Candidate	Votes	%
Democratic	Denise Jones Ennett (Incumbent)	2,656	69.66%
Democratic	Russell Williams III	1,157	30.34%
Total votes		3,813	100.0
General election
Democratic	Denise Jones Ennett (Incumbent)	8,180	100.0%
Total votes		8,180	100.0

=== 2019 ===
2019 Arkansas House of Representatives special election, district 36
Primary election
Party	Candidate	Votes	%
Democratic	Denise Jones Ennett	446	32.46%
Democratic	Darrell Stephens	431	31.37%
Democratic	Philip Hood	269	19.58%
Democratic	Roderick Greer Talley	154	11.21%
Democratic	Russell Williams III	74	5.39%
Total votes		1,374	100.0
Runoff election
Democratic	Denise Jones Ennett	583	57.78%
Democratic	Darrell Stephens	426	42.22%
Total votes		1,009	100.0
