= 2010 Arkansas gubernatorial election =

- November 2, 2010
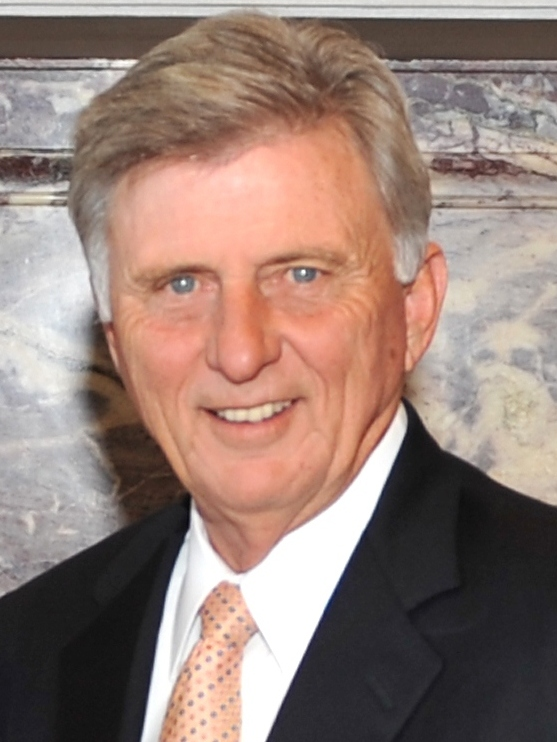

Nominee	Mike Beebe	Jim Keet
Party	Democratic	Republican
Popular vote	503,336	262,784
Percentage	64.42%	33.63%
- Beebe: 50–60% 60–70% 70–80% 80–90%
Governor before election
Mike Beebe
Democratic
Elected Governor
Mike Beebe
Democratic

The 2010 Arkansas gubernatorial election took place on Tuesday, November 2, 2010. Incumbent Democratic Governor Mike Beebe ran for re-election, and faced former State Senator Jim Keet, whom he defeated in a landslide to win a second and final term as governor, despite the year being a Republican midterm wave year and Democratic senator Blanche Lincoln being unseated by a 21-point margin on the same ballot. Beebe's re-election was also despite Republicans on the same ballot gaining the offices of lieutenant governor, secretary of state, and commissioner of state lands.

Beebe's vote percentage and margin of victory was the highest of any Democratic gubernatorial candidate in the country in 2010. This was also the only Arkansas gubernatorial election since Democrat David Pryor in 1976 in which either major party nominee won every county.

As of 2026, this, alongside the concurrent treasurer, state auditor, and attorney general elections, is the last time Democrats won any statewide election in Arkansas. Because of this, this was the last time a Democrat was elected the governor of Arkansas to date. This was also the last time in which a gubernatorial nominee and a lieutenant gubernatorial nominee of different political parties were elected in Arkansas, and the last time that Arkansas simultaneously voted for gubernatorial and U.S. Senate candidates of different political parties.

== Candidates ==
=== Democratic Party ===
- Mike Beebe, incumbent governor

=== Republican Party ===
- Jim Keet, former state senator

=== Green Party ===
- Jim Lendall, former state representative and 2006 gubernatorial nominee

== General election ==
=== Predictions ===
Source	Ranking	As of
Cook Political Report	Safe D	October 14, 2010
Rothenberg	Safe D	October 28, 2010
RealClearPolitics	Likely D	November 1, 2010
Sabato's Crystal Ball	Likely D	October 28, 2010
CQ Politics	Safe D	October 28, 2010

=== Polling ===
Poll source	Date(s) administered	Mike Beebe (D)	Jim Keet (R)
Rasmussen Reports	October 28, 2010	60%	38%
CNN/Time Magazine	October 15–19, 2010	62%	35%
Rasmussen Reports	September 30, 2010	51%	41%
Mason-Dixon	September 12–14, 2010	54%	33%
Rasmussen Reports	August 18, 2010	53%	33%
Rasmussen Reports	July 20, 2010	50%	40%
Ipsos/Reuters	July 16–18, 2010	57%	35%
Talk Business	July 17, 2010	50%	41%
Rasmussen Reports	June 15, 2010	57%	33%
Rasmussen Reports	May 19, 2010	53%	38%

=== Results ===
Arkansas gubernatorial election, 2010
Party	Candidate	Votes	%	±%
Democratic	Mike Beebe (incumbent)	503,336	64.42%	+8.81%
Republican	Jim Keet	262,784	33.63%	−7.03%
Green	Jim Lendall	14,513	1.86%	+0.21%
Write-in		700	0.09%	N/A
Total votes		781,333	100.00%	N/A
Democratic hold				

==== By county ====
County	Mike Beebe Democratic		Jim Keet Republican		Jim Lendall Green		Write-in		Margin		Total
County	#	%	#	%	#	%	#	%	#	%	Total
Arkansas	3,765	76.32%	1,111	22.52%	46	0.93%	11	0.22%	2,654	53.80%	4,933
Ashley	3,742	66.27%	1,834	32.48%	69	1.22%	2	0.04%	1,908	33.79%	5,647
Baxter	8,128	54.52%	6,468	43.39%	306	2.05%	5	0.03%	1,660	11.14%	14,907
Benton	27,715	52.10%	24,600	46.25%	855	1.61%	24	0.05%	3,115	5.86%	53,194
Boone	8,843	59.16%	5,602	37.48%	483	3.23%	19	0.13%	3,241	21.68%	14,947
Bradley	2,164	74.96%	696	24.11%	27	0.94%	0	0.00%	1,468	50.85%	2,887
Calhoun	1,143	70.73%	448	27.72%	25	1.55%	0	0.00%	695	43.01%	1,616
Carroll	5,166	62.17%	2,876	34.61%	267	3.21%	0	0.00%	2,290	27.56%	8,309
Chicot	2,404	79.95%	573	19.06%	30	1.00%	0	0.00%	1,831	60.89%	3,007
Clark	5,772	75.66%	1,685	22.09%	172	2.25%	0	0.00%	4,087	53.57%	7,629
Clay	3,055	73.65%	1,029	24.81%	64	1.54%	0	0.00%	2,026	48.84%	4,148
Cleburne	5,029	54.92%	3,955	43.19%	170	1.86%	3	0.03%	1,074	11.73%	9,157
Cleveland	1,539	64.04%	807	33.58%	54	2.25%	3	0.12%	732	30.46%	2,403
Columbia	4,484	63.91%	2,423	34.54%	109	1.55%	0	0.00%	2,061	29.38%	7,016
Conway	4,439	72.14%	1,595	25.92%	117	1.90%	2	0.03%	2,844	46.22%	6,153
Craighead	14,557	67.87%	6,580	30.68%	302	1.41%	10	0.05%	7,977	37.19%	21,449
Crawford	8,433	57.13%	6,035	40.89%	281	1.90%	11	0.07%	2,398	16.25%	14,760
Crittenden	8,256	70.20%	3,171	26.96%	159	1.35%	175	1.49%	5,085	43.24%	11,761
Cross	3,651	70.77%	1,435	27.82%	73	1.42%	0	0.00%	2,216	42.95%	5,159
Dallas	1,807	73.49%	628	25.54%	24	0.98%	0	0.00%	1,179	47.95%	2,459
Desha	2,981	84.28%	517	14.62%	34	0.96%	5	0.14%	2,464	69.66%	3,537
Drew	3,124	70.57%	1,228	27.74%	75	1.69%	0	0.00%	1,896	42.83%	4,427
Faulkner	16,188	59.66%	10,434	38.45%	495	1.82%	17	0.06%	5,754	21.21%	27,134
Franklin	3,282	62.28%	1,833	34.78%	152	2.88%	3	0.06%	1,449	27.50%	5,270
Fulton	2,194	61.92%	1,260	35.56%	89	2.51%	0	0.00%	934	26.36%	3,543
Garland	18,424	60.44%	11,490	37.70%	558	1.83%	9	0.03%	6,934	22.75%	30,481
Grant	3,319	63.49%	1,816	34.74%	88	1.68%	5	0.10%	1,503	28.75%	5,228
Greene	6,213	67.61%	2,809	30.57%	168	1.83%	0	0.00%	3,404	37.04%	9,190
Hempstead	3,238	66.16%	1,550	31.67%	104	2.13%	2	0.04%	1,688	34.49%	4,894
Hot Spring	5,606	66.79%	2,520	30.02%	264	3.15%	4	0.05%	3,086	36.76%	8,394
Howard	2,185	69.70%	900	28.71%	50	1.59%	0	0.00%	1,285	40.99%	3,135
Independence	6,056	65.47%	3,033	32.79%	156	1.69%	5	0.05%	3,023	32.68%	9,250
Izard	2,875	63.13%	1,550	34.04%	129	2.83%	0	0.00%	1,325	29.10%	4,554
Jackson	2,993	75.79%	891	22.56%	65	1.65%	0	0.00%	2,102	53.23%	3,949
Jefferson	14,724	78.77%	3,667	19.62%	279	1.49%	23	0.12%	11,057	59.15%	18,693
Johnson	3,939	66.19%	1,862	31.29%	150	2.52%	0	0.00%	2,077	34.90%	5,951
Lafayette	1,342	64.58%	706	33.97%	30	1.44%	0	0.00%	636	30.61%	2,078
Lawrence	3,400	73.06%	1,151	24.73%	102	2.19%	1	0.02%	2,249	48.32%	4,654
Lee	2,509	83.38%	461	15.32%	38	1.26%	1	0.03%	2,048	68.06%	3,009
Lincoln	2,072	67.78%	791	25.88%	69	2.26%	125	4.09%	1,281	41.90%	3,057
Little River	2,537	69.72%	1,047	28.77%	55	1.51%	0	0.00%	1,490	40.95%	3,639
Logan	4,167	66.48%	1,979	31.57%	118	1.88%	4	0.06%	2,188	34.91%	6,268
Lonoke	9,124	55.60%	7,043	42.92%	238	1.45%	4	0.02%	2,081	12.68%	16,409
Madison	3,097	61.35%	1,831	36.27%	120	2.38%	0	0.00%	1,266	25.08%	5,048
Marion	3,267	57.07%	2,222	38.81%	205	3.58%	31	0.54%	1,045	18.25%	5,725
Miller	5,832	54.87%	4,625	43.51%	167	1.57%	5	0.05%	1,207	11.36%	10,629
Mississippi	7,927	73.69%	2,557	23.77%	270	2.51%	3	0.03%	5,370	49.92%	10,757
Monroe	2,226	82.60%	439	16.29%	29	1.08%	1	0.04%	1,787	66.31%	2,695
Montgomery	1,969	65.81%	943	31.52%	80	2.67%	0	0.00%	1,026	34.29%	2,992
Nevada	1,782	71.68%	666	26.79%	35	1.41%	3	0.12%	1,116	44.89%	2,486
Newton	1,916	56.87%	1,329	39.45%	119	3.53%	5	0.15%	587	17.42%	3,369
Ouachita	5,562	71.70%	2,063	26.60%	131	1.69%	1	0.01%	3,499	45.11%	7,757
Perry	1,919	61.84%	1,091	35.16%	93	3.00%	0	0.00%	828	26.68%	3,103
Phillips	5,433	85.41%	839	13.19%	89	1.40%	0	0.00%	4,594	72.22%	6,361
Pike	2,112	67.71%	940	30.14%	67	2.15%	0	0.00%	1,172	37.58%	3,119
Poinsett	4,488	69.20%	1,838	28.34%	155	2.39%	5	0.08%	2,650	40.86%	6,486
Polk	3,755	58.32%	2,561	39.77%	122	1.89%	1	0.02%	1,194	18.54%	6,439
Pope	9,601	61.68%	5,618	36.09%	318	2.04%	29	0.19%	3,983	25.59%	15,566
Prairie	1,884	74.47%	595	23.52%	50	1.98%	1	0.04%	1,289	50.95%	2,530
Pulaski	78,055	70.40%	31,120	28.07%	1,635	1.47%	70	0.06%	46,935	42.33%	110,880
Randolph	3,146	68.86%	1,290	28.23%	127	2.78%	6	0.13%	1,856	40.62%	4,569
Saline	20,488	58.29%	14,078	40.05%	561	1.60%	20	0.06%	6,410	18.24%	35,147
Scott	2,054	63.51%	1,119	34.60%	61	1.89%	0	0.00%	935	28.91%	3,234
Searcy	1,903	56.77%	1,345	40.13%	103	3.07%	1	0.03%	558	16.65%	3,352
Sebastian	18,531	60.44%	11,563	37.71%	540	1.76%	27	0.09%	6,968	22.73%	30,661
Sevier	2,153	65.62%	1,069	32.58%	59	1.80%	0	0.00%	1,084	33.04%	3,281
Sharp	3,607	59.58%	2,279	37.64%	165	2.73%	3	0.05%	1,328	21.94%	6,054
St. Francis	5,361	77.39%	1,469	21.21%	93	1.34%	4	0.06%	3,892	56.19%	6,927
Stone	3,177	63.64%	1,684	33.73%	128	2.56%	3	0.06%	1,493	29.91%	4,992
Union	7,412	61.08%	4,540	37.41%	183	1.51%	0	0.00%	2,872	23.67%	12,135
Van Buren	3,493	63.83%	1,824	33.33%	155	2.83%	0	0.00%	1,669	30.50%	5,472
Washington	26,987	60.44%	16,585	37.14%	1,080	2.42%	0	0.00%	10,402	23.30%	44,652
White	12,615	63.68%	6,909	34.88%	277	1.40%	8	0.04%	5,706	28.81%	19,809
Woodruff	1,889	85.44%	290	13.12%	32	1.45%	0	0.00%	1,599	72.32%	2,211
Yell	3,111	67.48%	1,374	29.80%	125	2.71%	0	0.00%	1,737	37.68%	4,610
TOTALS	503,336	64.42%	262,784	33.63%	14,513	1.86%	700	0.09%	240,552	30.79%	781,333

Counties that flipped from Republican to Democratic

- Benton (largest city: Rogers)
- Boone (largest city: Harrison)
- Carroll (largest city: Berryville)
- Newton (largest city: Jasper)
- Madison (largest city: Huntsville)
- Marion (largest city: Bull Shoals)
- Baxter (largest city: Mountain Home)
- Searcy (largest city: Marshall)
- Saline (largest city: Benton)
- Lonoke (largest city: Cabot)
- Polk (largest city: Mena)
- Sebastian (largest city: Fort Smith)
- Crawford (largest city: Van Buren)
- Pope (largest city: Russellville)
