= Information quality =

Quality of the content of information systems

Information quality (IQ) is a contextual property of or a perspective to the content within information systems. There exist two complementary yet partially conflicting definitions of high-quality: firstly, information is considered high quality if it is fit for its intended purpose; secondly, it is deemed high quality if it conforms to specified requirements.

The primary distinction between these definitions is that Juran's perspective focuses on the suitability of information for its intended purpose, which can be measured by the success of its application even without direct access to or exact knowledge of the data. For example, a black-box AI with access to English Wikipedia can work well for users' purposes but using Estonian Wikipedia fails for the same purposes. Given that the AI remains the same, it can be concluded that English version data would be of higher quality in comparison to Estonian version, even without exact comparison of data contents and their properties in each version. In contrast, Crosby emphasizes adherence to predefined specifications, assuming specific criteria rather than measuring the success of its use; for instance, information in Wikipedia could be proven to be good based on criteria such as existing peer validation and academic references, even if the AI results are poor. This approach falls into problems when data is not completely accessible or all quality properties cannot be known and measured leading to false impression of quality due to lacking and misleading metrics.

Numerous IQ frameworks and methodologies provide tangible approach to assess and measure DQ/IQ in a robust and rigorous manner.

== Conceptual problems ==
Although the foundational definitions are usable for most everyday purposes, specialists often use more complex models for information quality. It has been suggested, however, that higher the quality the greater will be the confidence in meeting more general, less specific contexts.

== Dimensions and metrics of information quality ==
"Information quality" is a measure of its fitness for use or conformance to requirements. In this way, "quality" is considered contextual and it can then vary across users and uses of the information. The exact degree of quality is often described with dimensions such as accuracy, timeliness, completeness, and similar scales. Although a huge amount of academic research has been directed to these dimensions, there does not exist consensus on their definitions or practical usefulness.

Historically, Richard Wang and Diane Strong proposed a list of dimensions or elements used in assessing Information Quality is:

- Intrinsic IQ: accuracy, objectivity, believability, reputation
- Contextual IQ: relevance, value-added, timeliness, completeness, amount of information
- Representational IQ: interpretability, format, coherence, compatibility
- Accessibility IQ: accessibility, access security

Other authors propose similar but different lists of dimensions for analysis, and emphasize measurement and reporting as information quality metrics. Larry English prefers the term "characteristics" to dimensions. However, a considerable amount of information quality research involves investigating and describing various categories of desirable attributes (or dimensions) of data. Research has recently shown the huge diversity of terms and classification structures used.

=== Quality metrics ===
- Authority/verifiability

Authority refers to the expertise or recognized official status of a source. Consider the reputation of the author and publisher. When working with legal or government information, consider whether the source is the official provider of the information. Verifiability refers to the ability of a reader to verify the validity of the information irrespective of how authoritative the source is. To verify the facts is part of the duty of care of the journalistic deontology, as well as, where possible, to provide the sources of information so that they can be verified

- Scope of coverage

Scope of coverage refers to the extent to which a source explores a topic. Consider time periods, geography or jurisdiction and coverage of related or narrower topics.

- Composition and organization

Composition and organization has to do with the ability of the information source to present its particular message in a coherent, logically sequential manner.

- Objectivity

Objectivity is the bias or opinion expressed when a writer interprets or analyze facts. Consider the use of persuasive language, the source's presentation of other viewpoints, its reason for providing the information and advertising.

- Integrity
1. Adherence to moral and ethical principles; soundness of moral character
2. The state of being whole, entire, or undiminished
- Comprehensiveness
1. Of large scope; covering or involving much; inclusive: a comprehensive study.
2. Comprehending mentally; having an extensive mental grasp.
3. Insurance. covering or providing broad protection against loss.
- Validity

Validity of some information has to do with the degree of obvious truthfulness which the information carries

- Uniqueness

As much as 'uniqueness' of a given piece of information is intuitive in meaning, it also significantly implies not only the originating point of the information but also the manner in which it is presented and thus the perception which it conjures. The essence of any piece of information we process consists to a large extent of those two elements.

- Timeliness

Timeliness refers to information that is current at the time of publication. Consider publication, creation and revision dates. Beware of Web site scripting that automatically reflects the current day's date on a page.

- Reproducibility (utilized primarily when referring to instructive information)

Means that documented methods are capable of being used on the same data set to achieve a consistent result.

== Professional associations ==
IQ International—the International Association for Information and Data Quality
IQ International is a not-for-profit, vendor neutral, professional association formed in 2004, dedicated to building the information and data quality profession.

CDOIQ Society
Chief Data Officers and Information Quality Society is a global professional society supporting data leaders with networking, meetings, best practices, experience, certification, and training.

== Information quality conferences ==
A number of major conferences relevant to information quality are held annually:

Annual MIT Chief Data Officer & Information Quality (CDOIQ) Symposium
Annual conferences held at the Massachusetts Institute of Technology, Cambridge, MA, USA

Data Governance and Information Quality Conference
Commercial conferences held each year in the USA

Data Quality Asia Pacific
Commercial conference held annually in Sydney or Melbourne, Australia

Enterprise Data and Business Intelligence Conference Europe
Commercial conferences held annually in London, England.
Information and Data Quality Conference
Not for profit conference run annually by IQ International (the International Association for Information and Data Quality) in the USA
International Conference on Information Quality
Academic Conference launched through MITIQ held annually at a University
Master Data Management & Data Governance Conferences
Six major conferences are run annually by the MDM Institute in venues such as London, San Francisco, Sydney, Toronto, Madrid, Frankfurt, Shanghai and New York City.

== See also ==
- Data quality
- Accuracy and precision
- Information pollution
- Information Quality (InfoQ)
