= Richard Y. Wang =

- Education: Massachusetts Institute of Technology (Ph.D. in IT)
- Occupations: Principal Research Scientist at MIT; Tenured Professor, UALR

Richard Y. Wang is the founder and executive director of the Chief Data Officer and Information Quality (CDOIQ) Program at the Massachusetts Institute of Technology. Wang is widely acknowledged as the "Founder of Information Quality"—the scholar who made Information Quality an established field. For the past three decades, he advocated that the importance of information quality must be embraced at the highest level of organizations. He championed and led a movement to establish the position of Chief Data Officers in all organizations. His pioneering work culminated in a wide-scale adoption of the Chief Data Officer role worldwide. Notably, in 2019, the U.S. Congress enacted the Foundations for Evidence-Based Policymaking Act of 2018 into law, which statutorily mandated all federal agencies to establish and appoint a CDO for their agency.

Wang had served as a professor at the MIT Sloan School of Management for almost a decade. Currently he is Principal Research Scientist at the MIT Sloan School of Management. Also, he is a tenured University Professor of Information Quality and Director of the Institute for Chief Data Officers at the University of Arkansas at Little Rock. He is an Honorary Professor at Xi’An Jiao Tong University, China. He received a Ph.D. in Information Technology from the MIT Sloan School of Management in 1985.

== Establishing the Information Quality Field ==
From the early days of his academic career, Wang published many books and research articles on information quality. His research on defining Information Quality is widely regarded as the theoretical foundation that facilitated the emergence of Information Quality as a field of study. More importantly, he brought together a community of researchers and practitioners centering on the vision that information quality is essential for organizational performance and prosperity. In 1996, Wang organized the premier International Conference on Information Quality, in which he has served as the general conference chair and currently serves as chairman of the board. Wang's books on information quality include Journey to Data Quality (MIT Press, 2006), Information Quality: Advances in Management Information Systems (M.E. Sharpe, 2005), Introduction to Information Quality (MITIQ Publications, 2005), Data Quality (Kluwer Academic, 2001), and Quality Information and Knowledge (Prentice Hall, 1999).

Also, Wang has been instrumental in the establishment of the Ph.D. and Master of Science in Information Quality degree program at the University of Arkansas at Little Rock, the Stuart Madnick IQ Best Paper Award for the International Conference on Information Quality, the comprehensive IQ Ph.D. dissertations website, and the Donald Ballou & Harry Pazer IQ Ph.D. Dissertation Award.

Wang is the recipient of the 2005 DAMA International Lifetime Achievement Award. Previous recipients of this award include Edgar F. Codd for inventing the Relational Data model and Peter Chen for the Entity-Relationship model.

== Establishing the Role of Chief Data Officers ==
Wang has been a strong advocate of the idea that improving and maintaining information quality must be in the purview of the top management. He has done extensive work on information quality collaborating with the U.S. government agencies and prominent corporations. In 2005, he received a certificate of appreciation from the Director of the Central Intelligence Agency and a letter of appreciation from the Director of National Intelligence. From 2009 to 2011, Wang served as the Deputy CDO and Chief Data Quality Officer of the U.S. Army, for which he received letters of appreciation from the Army's Chief Information Officer and the CIO at the Office of the Secretary of Defense. From 2017 to 2019, he served as the first CDO for the state of Arkansas.

Wang's research on CDO and their roles is generally accepted as a standard framework for thinking about CDO positions in private and public sector organizations. In 2011, Wang founded and chaired the Inaugural MIT-Army CDO Forum, establishing this CDO Forum as an annual event at MIT. In addition, he has been chairing the Annual Chief Data Officer and Information Quality (CDOIQ) Symposium since 2007. This Annual Symposium has facilitated the exchange and dissemination of knowledge, skills, and innovations among Chief Data Officers and "de facto" CDOs—high-level executives who make critical decisions regarding how their organization leverage rapidly growing massive volume of data available to these organizations.

Through his work in academia and both the public and private sectors, Wang championed and led the movement to establish the role of CDOs in all organizations. This movement gained significant momentum and spread worldwide. In particular, in 2019, President Trump signed the Foundations for Evidence-Based Policymaking Act of 2018 into law, which statutorily mandated all federal agencies to establish and appoint a CDO for their agency. In 2021, President Biden also issued the Presidential Memorandum on Restoring Trust in Government Through Scientific Integrity and Evidence-Based Policymaking and reaffirmed the central role of CDOs to "incorporate scientific-integrity principles consistent with this memorandum into agencies’ data governance and evaluation approaches." In 2021, CDOs and data leaders from 62 countries attended the Annual CDOIQ Symposium that Wang organized. Many CDOs and data executives rose to their position while attending the CDOIQ Symposium every year for more than a decade or have taken on an executive position that Wang's advocacy and research inspired to create. This Symposium has been serving as a professional "home base" for this cohesive community of CDOs and data executives for networking with one another and sharing their innovation, knowledge, and experience in leading how their organization leverages the massive volume of data available to them.
