= Jim Lendall =

American politician

Member of the Arkansas House of Representatives
- In office January 11, 1999 – January 10, 2005
- Preceded by: Bob Keltner
- Succeeded by: Pam Adcock
- Constituency: 52nd district (1999–2003); 35th district (2003–2005)
- In office January 9, 1989 – January 14, 1991
- Preceded by: George Wimberly
- Succeeded by: Phil Wyrick
- Constituency: 61st district

Personal details
- Born: James Everett Lendall; March 20, 1947 (age 79) Beverly, Massachusetts, U.S.
- Party: Democratic (1998–2005); Green (since 2005)
- Other political affiliations: Independent (until 1998)
- Education: University of Arkansas at Little Rock (BA); University of Arkansas for Medical Sciences (BSN)
- Occupation: Nurse; activist; politician

Military service
- Branch/service: United States Army
- Years of service: 1969–1971

James Everett Lendall (born March 20, 1947) is an American politician, activist, and nurse. Lendall was the 2010 Green Party candidate for Arkansas governor.

Lendall, a former State Representative from Little Rock, was elected to four terms in the state legislature as both a Democrat and an independent. Lendall finished fourth in the 2006 gubernatorial race with 12,593 votes for 1.7% of the total vote.

== Early life and education ==
James Lendall was born in Beverly, Massachusetts, in 1947. Lendall served in the United States Army from 1969 to 1971. He graduated from the University of Arkansas at Little Rock with a Bachelor of Arts in political science and history in 1974 and from the University of Arkansas for Medical Sciences with a Bachelor of Science in nursing in 1985.

He worked at the University of Arkansas for Medical Sciences and is currently a registered nurse at Arkansas Children's Hospital.

Lendall joined the Green Party of Arkansas in 2005 and is currently one of the party's two representatives on the Green National Committee.
