= 2026 Arkansas Senate election =

- November 3, 2026

17 of 35 seats in the Arkansas Senate 18 seats needed for a majority
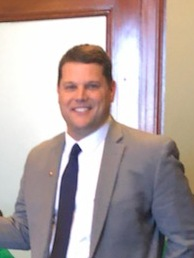

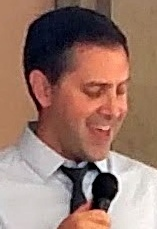
	Majority party	Minority party
Leader	Bart Hester	Greg Leding (term-limited)
Party	Republican	Democratic
Leader since	January 9, 2023	January 9, 2023
Leader's seat	33rd–Cave Springs	30th–Fayetteville
Seats before	29	6
Seats after	28	7
Seat change	▼1	▲1
Seats up	13	4
- Democratic gain Democratic hold Republican hold No regular election
President Pro Tempore before election
Bart Hester
Republican
Elected President Pro Tempore
Bart Hester
Republican

The 2026 Arkansas Senate election was held on November 3, 2026, alongside the other 2026 United States elections. Voters will elect members of the Arkansas Senate in 17 of the U.S. state of Arkansas's 35 state senate districts to serve a two-year term.

This election took place alongside races for U.S. Senate, U.S. House, governor, state house, and numerous other state and local offices.

== Retirements ==
=== Republican ===
1. District 13: Jane English is term-limited.
2. District 16: Kim Hammer term-limited, ran for secretary of state.

=== Democratic ===
1. District 9: Reginald Murdock is term-limited.
2. District 15: Fredrick Love term-limited, ran for governor.
3. District 30: Greg Leding is term-limited.

== Incumbents defeated ==
=== Republican ===
1. District 21: Blake Johnson lost renomination to state representative Jeremy Wooldridge.

== Special elections ==
District	County(ies)	Contest	Incumbent	Winner	Result	Cause
26th	Franklin (p); Johnson (p); Logan (p); Sebastian (p)	March 3, 2026	Gary Stubblefield (R)	Brad Simon (R)	Rep Hold.	Incumbent senator died September 2, 2025.

== Predictions ==
Source	Ranking	As of
Sabato's Crystal Ball	Safe R	January 22, 2026
State Navigate	Safe R	October 14, 2026

== Summary of results by district ==
Races unopposed by major parties. Minor parties and independents may still file to run. No Democrats filed No Republicans filed Both major parties filing No regular election

Major party candidates had until November 11, 2025 to submit their candidacies to appear on the primary election ballot. Candidates for newly-created political parties have until March 3, 2026, primary election day, to file to appear on the general election ballot. Independent candidates have until May 1.

District	2020 Pres.	Incumbent				Candidates
District	2020 Pres.	Member	Party	First elected	Status	Candidates
2nd	R+31.6	Matt Stone	Republican	2022	Incumbent re-elected.	▌ ✓ Sen. Matt Stone (Republican)
7th	R+50.6	Alan Clark	Republican	2012	Incumbent re-elected.	▌ ✓ Sen. Alan Clark (Republican)
9th	D+14.1	Reginald Murdock	Democratic	2022	Incumbent term-limited. Democratic hold.	▌ ✓ Rep. Jessie McGruder (Democratic); ▌Kenny Phillips (Republican)
10th	R+39.7	Ron Caldwell	Republican	2012	Incumbent re-elected.	▌ ✓ Sen. Ronald Caldwell (Republican)
11th	R+46.5	Ricky Hill	Republican	2018 (sp)	Incumbent re-elected.	▌ ✓ Sen. Ricky Hill (Republican)
13th	R+4.9	Jane English	Republican	2012	Incumbent term limited. Democratic gain.	▌ ✓ Allison Sweatman (Democratic); ▌Rep. Brandon Achor (Republican)
14th	D+23.9	Clarke Tucker	Democratic	2020	Incumbent re-elected.	▌ ✓ Sen. Clarke Tucker (Democratic)
15th	D+62.6	Fredrick Love	Democratic	2022	Incumbent term-limited. Democratic hold.	▌ ✓ Rep. Tara Shephard (Democratic)
16th	R+31.7	Kim Hammer	Republican	2018	Incumbent term-limited. Republican hold.	▌ ✓ Rodney Wright (Republican); ▌Joshua Irby (Democratic)
21st	R+59.5	Blake Johnson	Republican	2014	Incumbent lost renomination. Republican hold.	▌ ✓ Rep. Jeremy Wooldridge (Republican)
24th	R+60.2	Missy Irvin	Republican	2010	Incumbent re-elected.	▌ ✓ Sen. Missy Irvin (Republican)
27th	R+17.5	Justin Boyd	Republican	2022	Incumbent re-elected.	▌ ✓ Sen. Justin Boyd (Republican); ▌Eduardo Guzman (Democratic)
28th	R+49.5	Bryan King	Republican	2022; 2012	Incumbent re-elected.	▌ ✓ Sen. Bryan King (Republican)
30th	D+28.2	Greg Leding	Democratic	2018	Incumbent term-limited. Democratic hold.	▌ ✓ Rep. Denise Garner (Democratic)
31st	R+14.3	Clint Penzo	Republican	2022	Incumbent re-elected.	▌ ✓ Sen. Clint Penzo (Republican)
32nd	R+26.5	Joshua P. Bryant	Republican	2022	Incumbent re-elected.	▌ ✓ Sen. Joshua P. Bryant (Republican)
35th	R+35.2	Tyler Dees	Republican	2022	Incumbent re-elected.	▌ ✓ Sen. Tyler Dees (Republican)

== District 2 ==
District 2 election
Nominee	Matt Stone
Party	Republican
Incumbent Senator
Matt Stone
Republican

District 2 has been represented by Republican Matt Stone since 2023. He was first elected in 2022 with 67.76 percent of the vote, and is running for re-election. He went unopposed in the Republican primary, and is currently unopposed in the general election.

District 2 is located in southern Arkansas, and contains the entirety of Calhoun, Dallas, Ouachita, and Union counties, and part of Grant County.

=== Republican primary ===
The Republican primary election was cancelled after incumbent Senator Matt Stone filed to run for renomination unopposed.

==== Nominee ====
- Matt Stone, incumbent Senator

==== Fundraising ====
Campaign finance reports as of March 4, 2025
Candidate	Raised	Spent	Cash on hand
Matt Stone (R)	$133,425.00	$60,528.94	$125,429.53
Source: Arkansas Secretary of State

=== General election ===
==== Results ====
2026 Arkansas Senate election, 2nd district
Party	Candidate	Votes	%
Republican	Matt Stone (incumbent)		
Total votes			

== District 7 ==
District 7 election
Nominee	Alan Clark
Party	Republican
Incumbent Senator
Alan Clark
Republican

District 7 has been represented by Republican Alan Clark since 2013. He was re-elected in 2022 unopposed, and is running for re-election. He went unopposed in the Republican primary, and is currently unopposed in the general election.

District 7 is located in central Arkansas, and contains the entirety of Hot Spring County, and parts of Garland, Grant, and Saline counties.

=== Republican primary ===
The Republican primary election was cancelled after incumbent Senator Alan Clark filed to run for renomination unopposed.

==== Nominee ====
- Alan Clark, incumbent Senator

==== Fundraising ====
Campaign finance reports as of March 4, 2025
Candidate	Raised	Spent	Cash on hand
Alan Clark (R)	$75,412.00	$97,637.83	$82,978.31
Source: Arkansas Secretary of State

=== General election ===
==== Results ====
2026 Arkansas Senate election, 7th district
Party	Candidate	Votes	%
Republican	Alan Clark (incumbent)		
Total votes			

== District 9 ==
District 9 election
Nominee	Jessie McGruder	Kenny Phillips
Party	Democratic	Republican
Incumbent Senator
Reginald Murdock
Democratic

District 9 has been represented by Democrat Reginald Murdock since 2023. He was first elected in 2022 with 53.51 percent of the vote. He is term-limited.

District 9 is located in eastern Arkansas, and contains the entirety of Crittenden and Phillips counties, and parts of Lee and St. Francis counties.

=== Democratic primary ===
The Democratic primary was cancelled after Jessie McGruder filed to run unopposed.

==== Nominee ====
- Jessie McGruder, member of the Arkansas House of Representatives from the 35th district (2025–present)

==== Fundraising ====
Campaign finance reports as of March 4, 2025
Candidate	Raised	Spent	Cash on hand
Jessie McGruder (D)	$37,060.00	$4,238.00	$32,822.00
Source: Arkansas Secretary of State

=== Republican primary ===
The Republican primary was cancelled after Kenny Phillips filed to run unopposed.

==== Nominee ====
- Kenny Phillips, businessman

==== Fundraising ====
Campaign finance reports as of March 4, 2025
Candidate	Raised	Spent	Cash on hand
Kenny Phillips (R)	$26,752.10	$14,909.23	$11,842.87
Source: Arkansas Secretary of State

=== General election ===
==== Results ====
2026 Arkansas Senate election, 9th district
Party	Candidate	Votes	%
Democratic	Jessie McGruder		
Republican	Kenny Phillips		
Total votes			

== District 10 ==
District 10 election, Republican primary

Election not currently contested by any other political party or independent politician.
Candidate	Ron Caldwell	Trey Bohannan
Party	Republican	Republican
Popular vote	7,215	3,077
Percentage	70.10%	29.90%
- County results Caldwell: 50–60% 60–70% 70–80% 80–90%
Senator before election
Ron Caldwell
Republican
Elected Senator
TBD

District 10 has been represented by Republican Ron Caldwell since 2023, who previously represented the 23rd district. He was re-elected in 2022 with 72.49 percent of the vote, and is running for re-election. He fended off a primary challenge from businessman Trey Bohannan, who had the backing of Governor Sarah Huckabee Sanders. No Democratic or third party candidate filed for the seat, making the Republican primary tantamount to election.

District 10 is located in eastern Arkansas, and contains the entirety of Cross, Jackson, Monroe, Prairie, and Woodruff counties, and parts of Arkansas, Lee, Lonoke, Poinsett, and St. Francis counties.

=== Republican primary ===
==== Candidates ====
===== Nominee =====
- Ron Caldwell, incumbent Senator

===== Eliminated in primary =====
- Trey Bohannan, businessman

==== Fundraising ====
Campaign finance reports as of March 4, 2025
Candidate	Raised	Spent	Cash on hand
Ron Caldwell (R)	$372,375.00	$334,906.16	$115,314.24
Trey Bohannan (R)	$224,613.64	$169,995.85	$74,617.79
Source: Arkansas Secretary of State

==== Endorsements ====
Trey Bohannan

Politician

- Sarah Huckabee Sanders, 47th Governor of Arkansas (2023–present)

==== Results ====
2026 Arkansas Senate election, 10th district (Republican primary)
Party	Candidate	Votes	%
Republican	Ron Caldwell (incumbent)	7,215	70.10%
Republican	Trey Bohannan	3,077	29.90%
Total votes		10,292	100.00%

=== General election ===
==== Results ====
2026 Arkansas Senate election, 10th district
Party	Candidate	Votes	%
Republican	Ron Caldwell (incumbent)		
Total votes			

== District 11 ==
District 11 election
Nominee	Ricky Hill
Party	Republican
Incumbent Senator
Ricky Hill
Republican

District 11 has been represented by Republican Ricky Hill since 2018. He was re-elected in 2022 unopposed, and is running for re-election. He went unopposed in the Republican primary, and is currently unopposed in the general election.

District 11 is located in central Arkansas, and contains parts of Lonoke and Pulaski counties.

=== Republican primary ===
The Republican primary was cancelled after incumbent Senator Ricky Hill filed to run for renomination unopposed.

==== Presumptive nominee ====
- Ricky Hill, incumbent Senator

==== Fundraising ====
Campaign finance reports as of March 4, 2025
Candidate	Raised	Spent	Cash on hand
Ricky Hill (R)	$221,593.14	$77,565.57	$244,836.80
Source: Arkansas Secretary of State

=== General election ===
==== Results ====
2026 Arkansas Senate election, 11th district)
Party	Candidate	Votes	%
Republican	Ricky Hill (incumbent)		
Total votes			

== District 13 ==
District 13 election
Nominee	Brandon Achor	Allison Sweatman
Party	Republican	Democratic
Incumbent Senator
Jane English
Republican

District 13 has been represented by Republican Jane English since 2023, who previously represented the 30th district. She was re-elected in 2022 with 52.45 percent of the vote. She is term-limited.

District 13 is located in Central Arkansas, and contains parts of Pulaski County.

=== Republican primary ===
==== Candidates ====
===== Nominee =====
- Brandon Achor, member of the Arkansas House of Representatives from the 71st district (2023–present)

===== Eliminated in primary =====
- Mischa Martin, former state DCFS director

==== Fundraising ====
Campaign finance reports as of March 4, 2025
Candidate	Raised	Spent	Cash on hand
Brandon Achor (R)	$276,965.56	$263,907.16	$28,058.40
Mischa Martin (R)	$104,318.82	$117,477.59	$6,841.23
Source: Arkansas Secretary of State

==== Results ====
2026 Arkansas Senate election, 13th district (Republican primary)
Party	Candidate	Votes	%
Republican	Brandon Achor	4,137	55.29%
Republican	Mischa Martin	3,345	44.71%
Total votes		7,482	100.00%

=== Democratic primary ===
==== Candidates ====
===== Nominee =====
- Allison Sweatman, Democratic nominee for this district in 2022

===== Eliminated in primary =====
- Jason Williams, psychiatric nurse practitioner

==== Fundraising ====
Campaign finance reports as of March 4, 2025
Candidate	Raised	Spent	Cash on hand
Allison Sweatman (D)	$25,812.86	$15,249.34	$10,762.44
Jason Williams (D)	$6,278.33	$8,762.77	$705.18
Source: Arkansas Secretary of State

==== Results ====
2026 Arkansas Senate election, 13th district (Democratic primary)
Party	Candidate	Votes	%
Democratic	Allison Sweatman	4,661	54.66%
Democratic	Jason Williams	3,867	45.34%
Total votes		8,528	100.00%

=== General election ===
==== Results ====
2026 Arkansas Senate election, 13th district
Party	Candidate	Votes	%
Republican	Brandon Achor		
Democratic	Allison Sweatman		
Total votes			

== District 14 ==
District 14 election
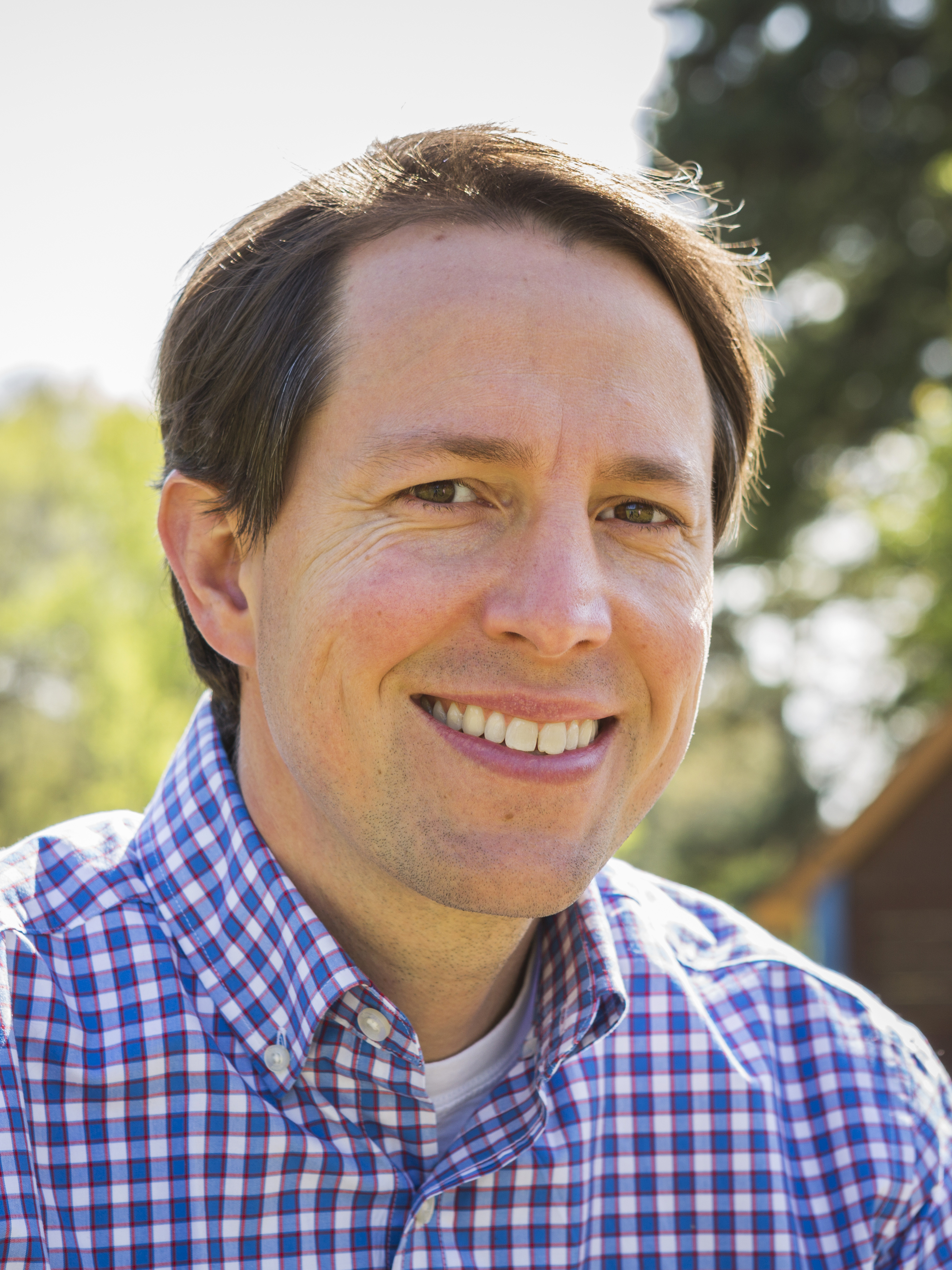
Nominee	Clarke Tucker
Party	Democratic
Incumbent Senator
Clarke Tucker
Democratic

District 14 has been represented by Democrat Clarke Tucker since 2023, who previously represented the 32nd district. He was re-elected in 2022 with 63.50 percent of the vote, and is running for re-election. He went unopposed in the Democratic primary, and is currently unopposed in the general election.

District 14 is located in Central Arkansas, and contains parts of Pulaski County.

=== Democratic primary ===
The Democratic primary was cancelled after incumbent Senator Clarke Tucker filed to run for renomination unopposed.

==== Nominee ====
- Clarke Tucker, incumbent Senator

==== Fundraising ====
Campaign finance reports as of March 4, 2025
Candidate	Raised	Spent	Cash on hand
Clarke Tucker (D)	$53,060.57	$86,933.62	$74,941.64
Source: Arkansas Secretary of State

=== General election ===
==== Results ====
2026 Arkansas Senate election, 14th district
Party	Candidate	Votes	%
Democratic	Clarke Tucker (incumbent)		
Total votes			

== District 15 ==
District 15 election, Democratic runoff

Election not currently contested by any other political party or independent politician.
Candidate	Tara Shephard	Charity Smith-Allen
Party	Democratic	Democratic
Popular vote	1,821	1,282
Percentage	58.69%	41.31%
Senator before election
Fredrick Love
Democratic
Elected Senator
TBD

District 15 has been represented by Democrat Fredrick Love since 2023. He was first elected in 2022 with 86.15 percent of the vote. He is term-limited. No Republican filed for the seat, making the Democratic primary tantamount to election.

District 15 is located in Central Arkansas, and contains parts of Pulaski County.

=== Democratic primary ===
==== Candidates ====
===== Nominee =====
- Tara Shephard, member of the Arkansas House of Representatives from the 79th district (2023–present)

===== Eliminated in runoff =====
- Charity Smith-Allen, educator

===== Eliminated in first round =====
- ShaRhonda Love

==== Fundraising ====
Campaign finance reports as of March 4, 2025
Candidate	Raised	Spent	Cash on hand
Tara Shephard (D)	$45,410.98	$44,660.14	$1,550.84
Charity Smith-Allen (D)	$109,625.00	$90,859.05	$28,765.95
ShaRhonda Love (D)	$6,964.75	$21,481.94	$1,982.82
Source: Arkansas Secretary of State

==== First round results ====
2026 Arkansas Senate election, 15th district (Democratic primary)
Party	Candidate	Votes	%
Democratic	Charity Smith-Allen	3,993	43.05%
Democratic	Tara Shephard	3,009	32.44%
Democratic	ShaRhonda Love	2,274	24.51%
Total votes		9,276	100.00%

==== Runoff results ====
2026 Arkansas Senate election, 15th district (Democratic runoff) Unofficial results
Party	Candidate	Votes	%
Democratic	Tara Shephard	1,821	58.69%
Democratic	Charity Smith-Allen	1,282	41.31%
Total votes		3,103	100.00%

== District 16 ==
District 16 election
Nominee	Rodney Wright	Joshua Irby
Party	Republican	Democratic
Incumbent Senator
Kim Hammer
Republican

District 16 has been represented by Republican Kim Hammer since 2019. He was re-elected in 2022 with 75.72 percent of the vote. He is term-limited.

District 16 is located in Central Arkansas, and contains parts of Pulaski and Saline counties.

=== Republican primary ===
==== Candidates ====
===== Nominee =====
- Rodney Wright, sheriff of Saline County

===== Eliminated in primary =====
- Randy Sams, insurance agent

==== Fundraising ====
Campaign finance reports as of March 4, 2025
Candidate	Raised	Spent	Cash on hand
Rodney Wright (R)	$105,808.76	$22,314.14	$83,494.62
Randy Sams (R)	$36,893.72	$39,392.45	$2,501.27
Source: Arkansas Secretary of State

==== Results ====
2026 Arkansas Senate election, 16th district (Republican primary)
Party	Candidate	Votes	%
Republican	Rodney Wright	5,445	67.73%
Republican	Randy Sams	2,594	32.27%
Total votes		8,039	100.00%

=== Democratic primary ===
The Democratic primary election was cancelled after Joshua Irby filed to run unopposed.

==== Nominee ====
- Joshua Irby, security professional

==== Fundraising ====
Campaign finance reports as of March 4, 2025
Candidate	Raised	Spent	Cash on hand
Joshua Irby (D)	$3,410.93	$2,454.83	$956.10
Source: Arkansas Secretary of State

=== General election ===
==== Results ====
2026 Arkansas Senate election, 16th district
Party	Candidate	Votes	%
Republican	Rodney Wright		
Democratic	Joshua Irby		
Total votes			

== District 21 ==
District 21 election, Republican primary

Election not currently contested by any other political party or independent politician.
Candidate	Jeremy Wooldridge	Blake Johnson
Party	Republican	Republican
Popular vote	7,446	4,484
Percentage	62.42%	37.58%
- County results Wooldridge: 50–60% 70–80% Johnson: 50–60%
Senator before election
Blake Johnson
Republican
Elected Senator
TBD

District 21 has been represented by Republican Blake Johnson since 2015. He was re-elected in 2022 with 83.85 percent of the vote. He ran for re-election but lost the Republican primary to state representative Jeremy Wooldridge in one of the most expensive legislative races in the state, with both candidates combining for a total expenditure of over half a million dollars. No Democratic or third party candidate filed for the seat, making the Republican primary tantamount to election.

District 21 is located in the northeastern corner of Arkansas, and contains the entirety of Clay, Greene and Randolph counties, and parts of Lawrence County.

=== Republican primary ===
==== Candidates ====
===== Nominee =====
- Jeremy Wooldridge, member of the Arkansas House of Representatives from the 1st district (2023–present)

===== Eliminated in primary =====
- Blake Johnson, incumbent Senator

==== Fundraising ====
Campaign finance reports as of March 4, 2025
Candidate	Raised	Spent	Cash on hand
Jeremy Wooldridge (R)	$410,950.13	$277,538.57	$233,411.56
Blake Johnson (R)	$277,527.00	$279,509.65	$23,593.34
Source: Arkansas Secretary of State

==== Results ====
2026 Arkansas Senate election, 21st district (Republican primary)
Party	Candidate	Votes	%
Republican	Jeremy Wooldridge	7,446	62.42%
Republican	Blake Johnson (incumbent)	4,483	37.58%
Total votes		11,929	100.00%

=== General election ===
==== Results ====
2026 Arkansas Senate election, 21st district
Party	Candidate	Votes	%
Republican	Jeremy Wooldridge		
Total votes			

== District 24 ==
District 24 election
Nominee	Missy Irvin
Party	Republican
Incumbent Senator
Missy Irvin
Republican

District 24 has been represented by Republican Missy Irvin since 2023, who previously represented the 10th and 18th districts. She was re-elected in 2022 unopposed, and is running for re-election. She went unopposed in the Republican primary, and is currently unopposed in the general election.

District 24 is located in southern Arkansas, and contains the entirety of Searcy, Stone, and Van Buren counties, and parts of Cleburne, Faulkner, and Newton counties.

=== Republican primary ===
The Republican primary was cancelled after incumbent Senator Missy Irvin filed to run for renomination unopposed.

==== Nominee ====
- Missy Irvin, incumbent Senator

==== Fundraising ====
Campaign finance reports as of March 4, 2025
Candidate	Raised	Spent	Cash on hand
Missy Irvin (R)	$94,950.00	$34,674.39	$112,154.89
Source: Arkansas Secretary of State

=== General election ===
==== Results ====
2026 Arkansas Senate election, 24th district
Party	Candidate	Votes	%
Republican	Missy Irvin (incumbent)		
Total votes			

== District 27 ==
District 27 election
Nominee	Justin Boyd	Eduardo Guzman
Party	Republican	Democratic
Incumbent Senator
Justin Boyd
Republican

District 27 has been represented by Republican Justin Boyd since 2023. He was first elected in 2022 with 63.57 percent of the vote, and is running for re-election.

District 27 is located in western Arkansas in the Fort Smith area, and contains part of Sebastian County.

=== Republican primary ===
The Republican primary was cancelled after incumbent Senator Justin Boyd filed to run for renomination unopposed.

==== Nominee ====
- Justin Boyd, incumbent Senator

==== Fundraising ====
Campaign finance reports as of March 4, 2025
Candidate	Raised	Spent	Cash on hand
Justin Boyd (R)	$102,250.00	$90,201.15	$61,566.07
Source: Arkansas Secretary of State

=== Democratic primary ===
The Democratic primary was cancelled after Eduardo Guzman filed to run unopposed.

==== Nominee ====
- Eduardo Guzman

==== Fundraising ====
Campaign finance reports as of March 4, 2025
Candidate	Raised	Spent	Cash on hand
Eduardo Guzman (D)	$1,779.73	$879.63	$900.10
Source: Arkansas Secretary of State

=== General election ===
==== Results ====
2026 Arkansas Senate election, 27th district
Party	Candidate	Votes	%
Republican	Justin Boyd (incumbent)		
Democratic	Eduardo Guzman		
Total votes			

== District 28 ==
District 28 election, Republican primary

Election not currently contested by any other political party or independent politician.
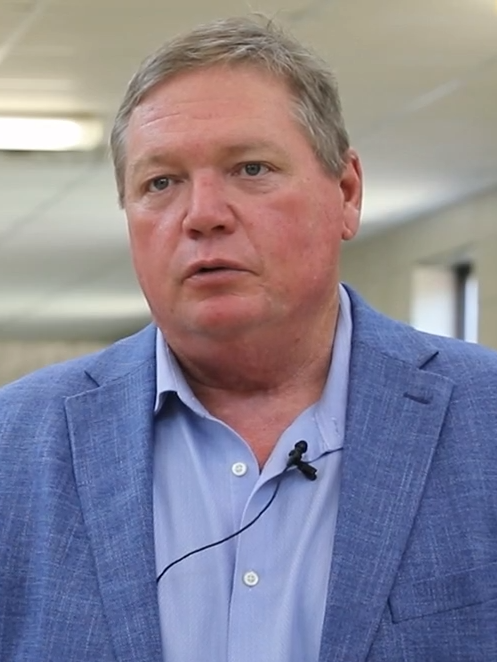

Candidate	Bryan King	Bob Ballinger
Party	Republican	Republican
Popular vote	8,5262	5,776
Percentage	59.61%	40.39%
- County results King: 50–60% 60–70% 70–80% Ballinger: 50–60% 60–70%
Senator before election
Bryan King
Republican
Elected Senator
TBD

District 28 has been represented by Republican Bryan King since 2023. He was first elected in 2022 with 75.96 percent of the vote. He is running for re-election. King fended off a primary challenge from former Republican state senator Bob Ballinger, who had been unseated by King in the 2022 Republican primary. No Democratic or third party candidate filed for the seat, making the Republican primary tantamount to election.

District 28 is located in Northern Arkansas, and contains the entirety of Carroll and Madison counties, and parts of Boone, Franklin, Johnson, and Newton counties.

=== Republican primary ===
==== Candidates ====
===== Nominee =====
- Bryan King, incumbent Senator

===== Eliminated in primary =====
- Bob Ballinger, former Senator from the 5th district (2019–2023)

==== Fundraising ====
Campaign finance reports as of March 4, 2025
Candidate	Raised	Spent	Cash on hand
Bryan King (R)	$95,557.00	$99,745.41	($3,391.41)
Bob Ballinger (R)	$134,804.83	$116,644.34	$18,160.49
Source: Arkansas Secretary of State

==== Results ====
2026 Arkansas Senate election, 28th district (Republican primary)
Party	Candidate	Votes	%
Republican	Bryan King (incumbent)	8,526	59.61%
Republican	Bob Ballinger	5,776	40.39%
Total votes		14,302	100.00%

=== General election ===
==== Results ====
2026 Arkansas Senate election, 28th district
Party	Candidate	Votes	%
Republican	Bryan King (incumbent)		
Total votes			

== District 30 ==
District 30 election
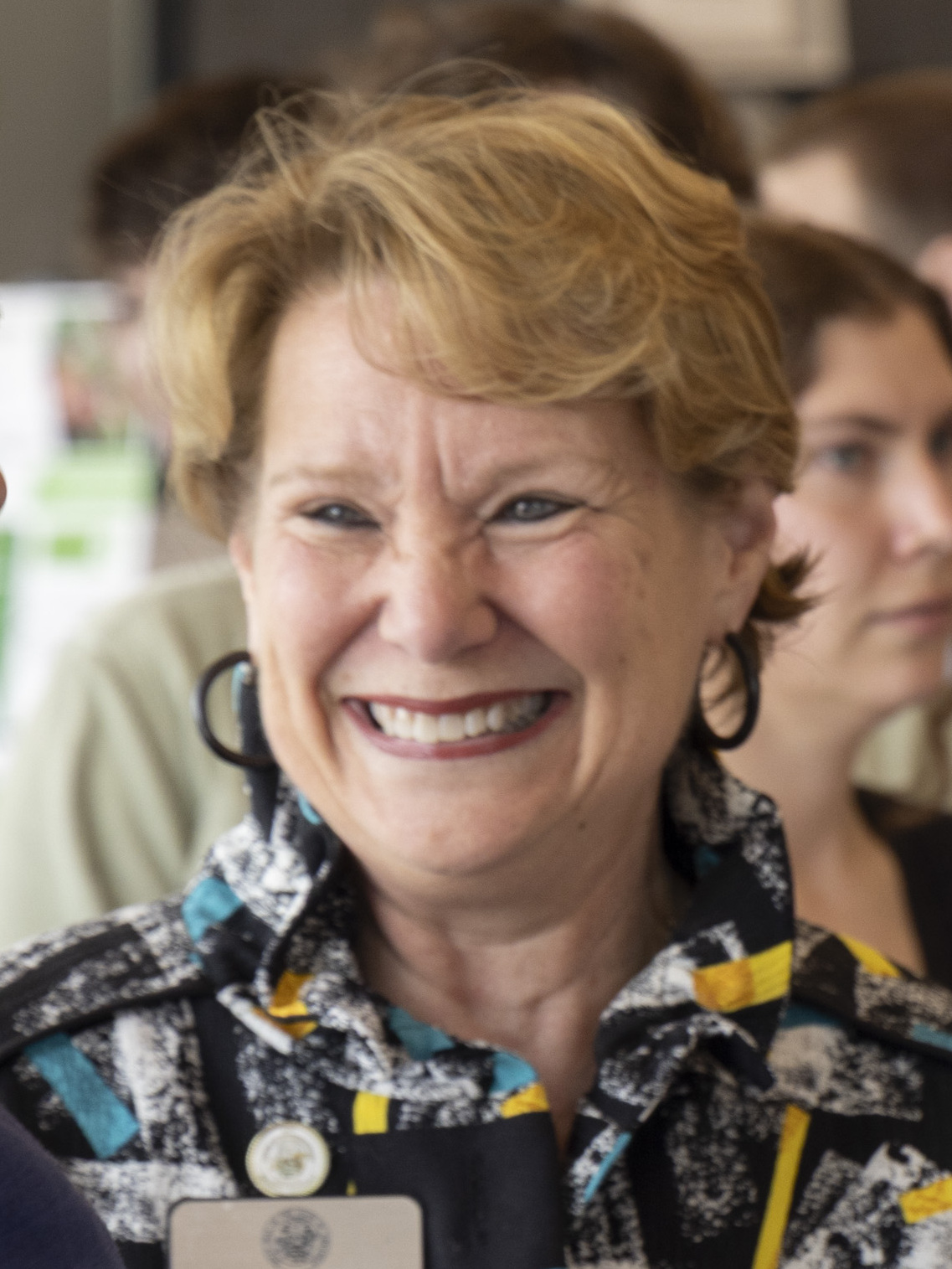
Nominee	Denise Garner
Party	Democratic
Incumbent Senator
Greg Leding
Democratic

District 30 has been represented by Democrat Greg Leding since 2023, who previously represented the 5th district. He was re-elected in 2022 unopposed. He is term-limited. State representative Denise Garner filed to succeed him, winning the primary unopposed and is currently unopposed in the general election.

District 30 is located in Northwest Arkansas, and contains parts of Washington County.

=== Democratic primary ===
The Democratic primary was cancelled after Denise Garner filed to run unopposed.

==== Nominee ====
- Denise Garner, member of the Arkansas House of Representatives from the 20th district (2019–present)

==== Fundraising ====
Campaign finance reports as of March 4, 2025
Candidate	Raised	Spent	Cash on hand
Denise Garner (D)	$50,206.02	$13,420.11	$43,539.30
Source: Arkansas Secretary of State

=== General election ===
==== Results ====
2026 Arkansas Senate election, 30th district
Party	Candidate	Votes	%
Democratic	Denise Garner		
Total votes			

== District 31 ==
District 31 election
Nominee	Clint Penzo
Party	Republican
Incumbent Senator
Clint Penzo
Republican

District 31 has been represented by Republican Clint Penzo since 2023. He was first elected in 2022 with 60.13 percent of the vote. He went unopposed in the Republican primary, and is currently unopposed in the general election.

District 31 is located in Northwest Arkansas, and contains parts of Washington County.

=== Republican primary ===
The Republican primary was cancelled after incumbent Senator Clint Penzo filed to run for renomination unopposed.

==== Nominee ====
- Clint Penzo, incumbent Senator

==== Fundraising ====
Campaign finance reports as of March 4, 2025
Candidate	Raised	Spent	Cash on hand
Clint Penzo (R)	$49,454.50	$19,192.80	$56,127.72
Source: Arkansas Secretary of State

=== General election ===
==== Results ====
2026 Arkansas Senate election, 31st district
Party	Candidate	Votes	%
Republican	Clint Penzo (incumbent)		
Total votes			

== District 32 ==
District 32 election
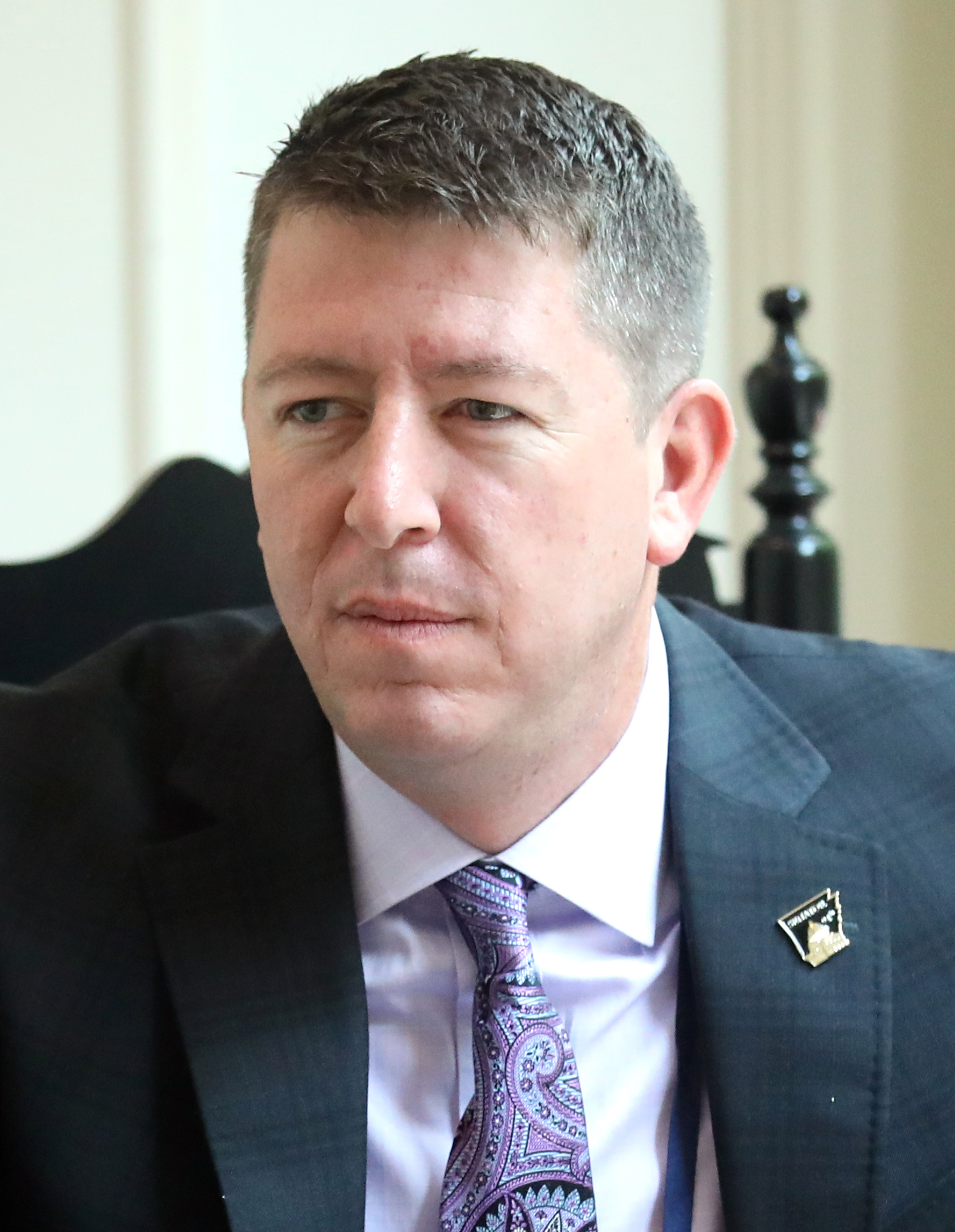
Nominee	Joshua P. Bryant
Party	Republican
Incumbent Senator
Joshua P. Bryant
Republican

District 32 has been represented by Republican Joshua P. Bryant since 2023. He was first elected in 2022 unopposed. He went unopposed in the Republican primary, and is currently unopposed in the general election.

District 32 is located in Northwest Arkansas, and contains parts of Benton and Washington counties.

=== Republican primary ===
The Republican primary was cancelled after incumbent Senator Joshua P. Bryant filed to run for renomination unopposed.

==== Nominee ====
- Joshua P. Bryant, incumbent Senator

==== Fundraising ====
Campaign finance reports as of March 4, 2025
Candidate	Raised	Spent	Cash on hand
Joshua P. Bryant (R)	$74,500.00	$26,389.71	$51,971.63
Source: Arkansas Secretary of State

=== General election ===
==== Results ====
2026 Arkansas Senate election, 32nd district
Party	Candidate	Votes	%
Republican	Joshua P. Bryant (incumbent)		
Total votes			

== District 35 ==
District 35 election
Nominee	Tyler Dees
Party	Republican
Incumbent Senator
Tyler Dees
Republican

District 35 has been represented by Republican Tyler Dees since 2023. He was first elected in 2022 with 73.68 percent of the vote. He went unopposed in the Republican primary, and is currently unopposed in the general election.

District 35 is located in Northwest Arkansas, and contains parts of Benton and Washington counties.

=== Republican primary ===
The Republican primary was cancelled after incumbent Senator Tyler Dees filed to run for renomination unopposed.

==== Nominee ====
- Tyler Dees, incumbent Senator

==== Fundraising ====
Campaign finance reports as of March 4, 2025
Candidate	Raised	Spent	Cash on hand
Tyler Dees (R)	$81,320.00	$45,374.43	$46,943.39
Source: Arkansas Secretary of State

=== General election ===
==== Results ====
2026 Arkansas Senate election, 35th district
Party	Candidate	Votes	%
Republican	Tyler Dees (incumbent)		
Total votes			

== See also ==
- List of Arkansas General Assemblies
