= 2022 Arkansas Senate election =

- November 8, 2022

All 35 seats in the Arkansas Senate 18 seats needed for a majority
	Majority party	Minority party
Leader	Jimmy Hickey Jr.	Keith Ingram
Party	Republican	Democratic
Leader since	January 11, 2021	January 15, 2013
Leader's seat	1st	24th
Seats before	28	7
Seats after	29	6
Seat change	▲1	▼1
Popular vote	591,186	187,923
Percentage	71.77%	22.81%
Swing	▲0.20%	▼5.22%
- Republican hold Republican gain Democratic hold Democratic gain Republican: 50–60% 60–70% 70–80% 80–90% 90–100% Democratic: 40–50% 50–60% 70–80% 80–90% 90–100%
President Pro Tempore before election
Jimmy Hickey Jr.
Republican
Elected President Pro Tempore
Bart Hester
Republican

The 2022 Arkansas Senate elections took place as part of the biennial 2022 United States elections. Arkansas voters elected state senators to the Arkansas Senate in each of the state's 35 senate districts. The primary elections in March 2022 determined which candidates would appear on the November 8, 2022, general election ballot.

== Composition ==
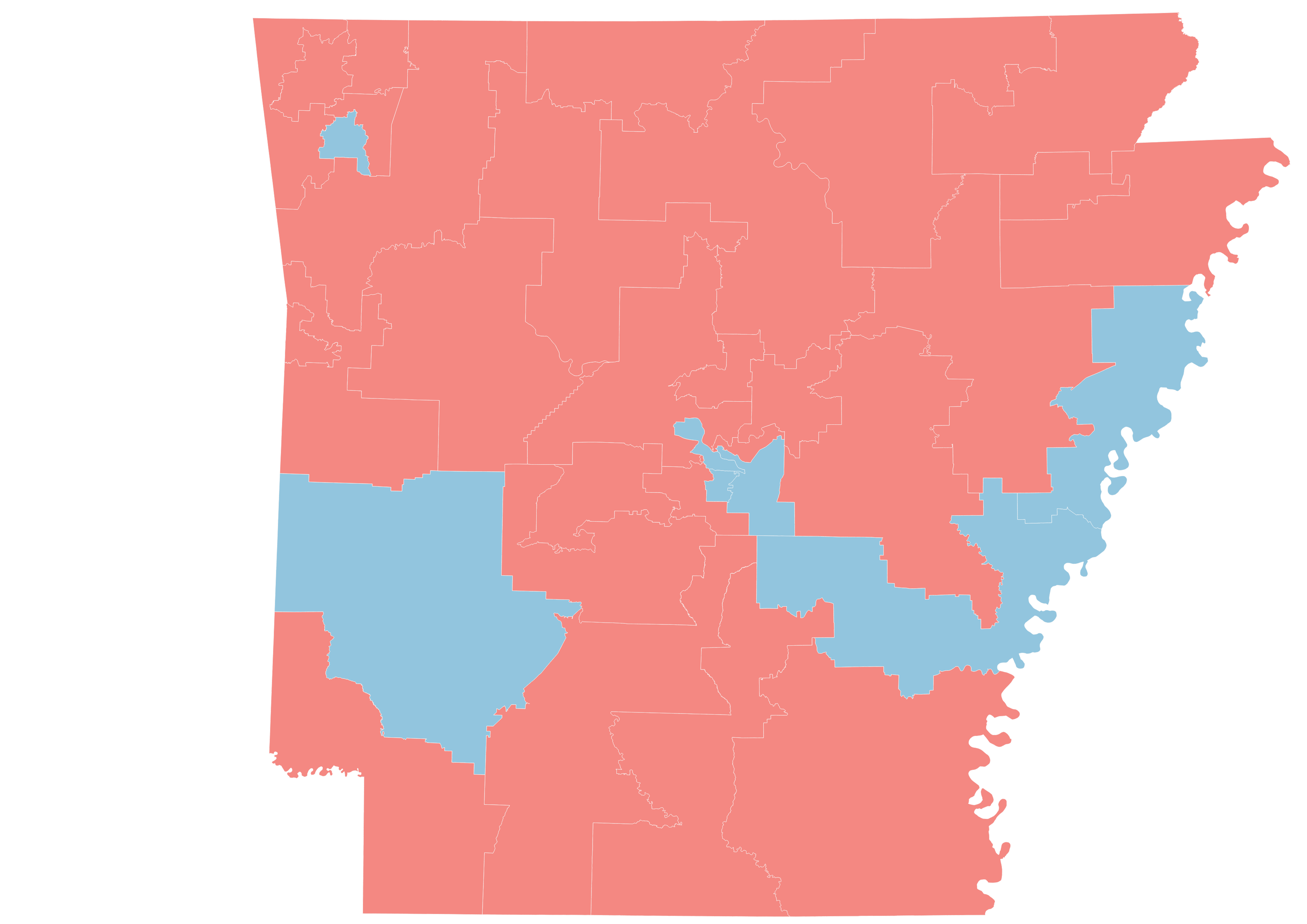
Partisan control by district before the 2022 elections

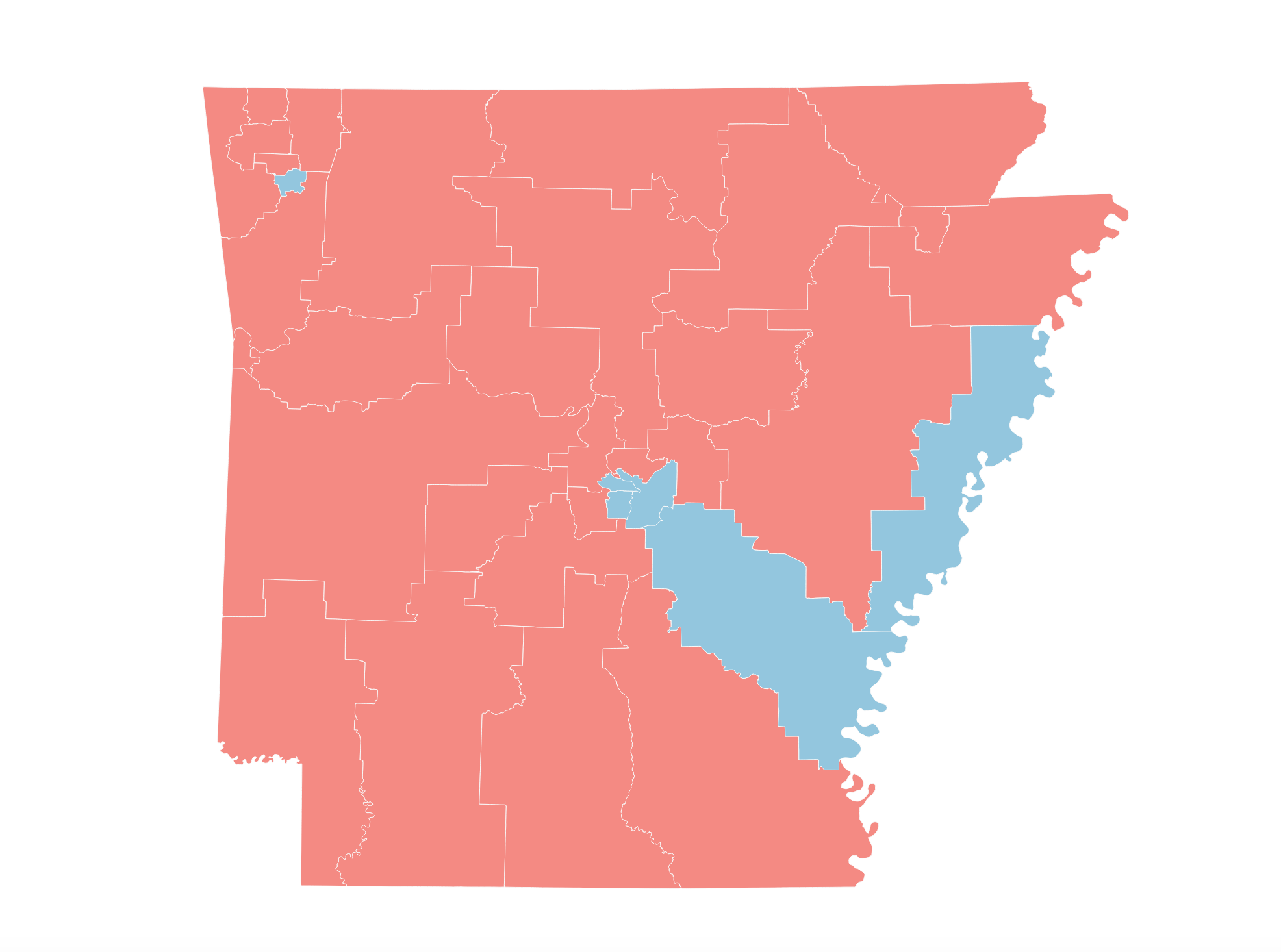
Senate partisan control following the 2022 elections

Affiliation	Party (Shading indicates majority caucus)		Total	
Affiliation	Republican	Democratic	Total	Vacant
Before election	28	7	35	
After election	29	6	35	
Change	▲1	▼1		

== Retirements ==
=== Democrats ===
1. District 10: Larry Teague retired.
2. District 24: Keith Ingram retired due to term limits.
3. District 31: Joyce Elliott retired due to term limits.

=== Independents ===
1. District 2: Jim Hendren retired.

=== Republicans ===
1. District 3: Cecile Bledsoe retired.
2. District 7: Colby Fulfer retired.
3. District 8: Mathew Pitsch retired to run for treasurer of Arkansas.
4. District 27: Trent Garner retired.
5. District 35: Jason Rapert retired to run for lieutenant governor of Arkansas.

== Incumbents defeated ==
=== In primaries ===
==== Republicans ====
1. District 3: Charles Beckham lost renomination to former Magnolia, Arkansas City Councilman Steve Crowell after being redistricted from District 12.
2. District 6: Bill Sample lost renomination to Garland County Justice of the Peace Matt McKee after being redistricted from District 14.
3. District 22: James Sturch lost renomination to House Representative John Payton after being redistricted from District 19.
4. District 28: Bob Ballinger lost renomination to former senator Bryan King after being redistricted from District 5.

== Predictions ==
Source	Ranking	As of
Sabato's Crystal Ball	Safe R	May 19, 2022

== Summary ==
County results with district splits Republicans: 50–60%; 60–70%; 70–80%; 80–90%; Unopposed; Democrats: 50–60%; 60–70%; 70–80%; 80–90%; Unopposed; Libertarians: 50–60%

- Note: All districts were renumbered following the redistricting process.

District	Incumbent	Party	Elected Senator	Party
1st	Ben Gilmore	Rep	Ben Gilmore	Rep
2nd	Jim Hendren	Ind	Matt Stone	Rep
3rd	Charles Beckham	Rep	Steve Crowell	Rep
3rd	Cecile Bledsoe	Rep	Steve Crowell	Rep
4th	Jimmy Hickey Jr.	Rep	Jimmy Hickey Jr.	Rep
5th	Terry Rice	Rep	Terry Rice	Rep
6th	Bill Sample	Rep	Matt Mckee	Rep
7th	Alan Clark	Rep	Alan Clark	Rep
7th	Colby Fulfer	Rep	Alan Clark	Rep
8th	Stephanie Flowers	Dem	Stephanie Flowers	Dem
8th	Mathew Pitsch	Rep	Stephanie Flowers	Dem
9th	New seat		Reginald Murdock	Dem
10th	Ron Caldwell	Rep	Ron Caldwell	Rep
10th	Larry Teague	Dem	Ron Caldwell	Rep
11th	Ricky Hill	Rep	Ricky Hill	Rep
12th	Linda Chesterfield	Dem	Linda Chesterfield	Dem
13th	Jane English	Rep	Jane English	Rep
14th	Clarke Tucker	Dem	Clarke Tucker	Dem
15th	New seat		Fredrick Love	Dem
16th	Kim Hammer	Rep	Kim Hammer	Rep
17th	Mark Johnson	Rep	Mark Johnson	Rep
18th	Jonathan Dismang	Rep	Jonathan Dismang	Rep
19th	Dave Wallace	Rep	Dave Wallace	Rep
20th	Dan Sullivan	Rep	Dan Sullivan	Rep
21st	Blake Johnson	Rep	Blake Johnson	Rep
22nd	James Sturch	Rep	John Payton	Rep
23rd	Scott Flippo	Rep	Scott Flippo	Rep
24th	Missy Irvin	Rep	Missy Irvin	Rep
24th	Keith Ingram	Dem	Missy Irvin	Rep
25th	Breanne Davis	Rep	Breanne Davis	Rep
26th	Gary Stubblefield	Rep	Gary Stubblefield	Rep
27th	Trent Garner	Rep	Justin Boyd	Rep
28th	Bob Ballinger	Rep	Bryan King	Rep
29th	New seat		Jim Petty	Rep
30th	Greg Leding	Dem	Greg Leding	Dem
31st	Joyce Elliott	Dem	Clint Penzo	Rep
32nd	New seat		Joshua Bryant	Rep
33rd	Bart Hester	Rep	Bart Hester	Rep
34th	New seat		Jim Dotson	Rep
35th	Jason Rapert	Rep	Tyler Dees	Rep

=== Closest races ===
Seats where the margin of victory was under 10%:

1. District 9, 7.02%
2. District 13, 8.12%

== Detailed results ==
=== District 1 ===
2022 Arkansas Senate election, 1st district
Party	Candidate	Votes	%
Republican	Ben Gilmore (incumbent)	21,580	100.00
Total votes		21,580	100.00
Republican hold			

=== District 2 ===
2022 Arkansas Senate election, 2nd district
Party	Candidate	Votes	%
Republican	Matt Stone	17,791	67.76
Democratic	Garry Smith	8,466	32.24
Total votes		26,257	100.00
Republican hold			

=== District 3 ===
2022 Arkansas Senate election, 3rd district
Party	Candidate	Votes	%
Republican	Alderman Steve Crowell	13,844	100.00
Total votes		13,844	100.00
Republican hold			

=== District 4 ===
2022 Arkansas Senate election, 4th district
Party	Candidate	Votes	%
Republican	Jimmy Hickey Jr. (incumbent)	17,715	79.08
Independent	Lonny M. Goodwin	4,687	20.92
Total votes		22,402	100.00

=== District 5 ===
2022 Arkansas Senate election, 5th district
Party	Candidate	Votes	%
Republican	Terry Rice (incumbent)	23,275	100.00
Total votes		23,275	100.00
Republican hold			

=== District 6 ===
2022 Arkansas Senate election, 6th district
Party	Candidate	Votes	%
Republican	Matt McKee	21,453	69.74
Democratic	Cortney Warwick McKee	9,307	30.26
Total votes		30,760	100.00

=== District 7 ===
2022 Arkansas Senate election, 7th district
Party	Candidate	Votes	%
Republican	Alan Clark (incumbent)	23,852	100.00
Total votes		23,852	100.00
Republican hold			

=== District 8 ===
2022 Arkansas Senate election, 8th district
Party	Candidate	Votes	%
Democratic	Stephanie Flowers (incumbent)	13,959	72.57
Libertarian	David Dinwiddie	5,275	27.43
Total votes		19,234	100.00

=== District 9 ===
2022 Arkansas Senate election, 9th district
Party	Candidate	Votes	%
Democratic	Reginald Murdock	10,119	53.51
Republican	Terry Fuller	8,793	46.49
Total votes		18,912	100.00

=== District 10 ===
2022 Arkansas Senate election, 10th district
Party	Candidate	Votes	%
Republican	Ronald Caldwell (incumbent)	17,753	72.49
Democratic	Cliff Hart	6,736	27.51
Total votes		24,489	100.00

=== District 11 ===
2022 Arkansas Senate election, 11th district
Party	Candidate	Votes	%
Republican	Ricky Hill (incumbent)	22,013	100.00
Total votes		22,013	100.00
Republican hold			

=== District 12 ===
2022 Arkansas Senate election, 12th district
Party	Candidate	Votes	%
Democratic	Linda Chesterfield (incumbent)	15,990	100.00
Total votes		15,990	100.00
Democratic hold			

=== District 13 ===
2022 Arkansas Senate election, 13th district
Party	Candidate	Votes	%
Republican	Jane English (incumbent)	16,522	52.45
Democratic	Allison Sweatman	13,963	44.33
Libertarian	Noah Jones	1,014	3.22
Total votes		31,499	100.00

=== District 14 ===
2022 Arkansas Senate election, 14th district
Party	Candidate	Votes	%
Democratic	Clarke Tucker (incumbent)	23,273	63.50
Republican	Beth Mason	13,375	36.50
Total votes		36,648	100.00

=== District 15 ===
2022 Arkansas Senate election, 15th district
Party	Candidate	Votes	%
Democratic	Fredrick Love	16,325	86.15
Libertarian	Charles Guidry	2,625	13.85
Total votes		18,950	100.00

=== District 16 ===
2022 Arkansas Senate election, 16th district
Party	Candidate	Votes	%
Republican	Kim Hammer (incumbent)	20,738	75.72
Libertarian	Jaron Salazar	6,649	24.28
Total votes		27,387	100.00

=== District 17 ===
2022 Arkansas Senate election, 17th district
Party	Candidate	Votes	%
Republican	Mark Johnson (incumbent)	16,835	58.72
Democratic	David Barber	11,834	41.28
Total votes		28,669	100.00

=== District 18 ===
2022 Arkansas Senate election, 18th district
Party	Candidate	Votes	%
Republican	Jonathan Dismang (incumbent)	21,632	80.43
Democratic	Nick Cartwright	4,383	16.30
Libertarian	James Burk	882	3.28
Total votes		26,897	100.00

=== District 19 ===
2022 Arkansas Senate election, 19th district
Party	Candidate	Votes	%
Republican	Dave Wallace (incumbent)	17,507	100.00
Total votes		17,507	100.00
Republican hold			

=== District 20 ===
2022 Arkansas Senate election, 20th district
Party	Candidate	Votes	%
Republican	Dan Sullivan (incumbent)	12,951	62.35
Democratic	Chenoa Summers	7,820	37.65
Total votes		20,771	100.00

=== District 21 ===
2022 Arkansas Senate election, 21st district
Party	Candidate	Votes	%
Republican	Blake Johnson (incumbent)	18,671	83.85
Libertarian	Alfred Holland III	3,596	16.15
Total votes		22,267	100.00

=== District 22 ===
2022 Arkansas Senate election, 22nd district
Party	Candidate	Votes	%
Republican	John Payton	24,186	100.00
Total votes		24,186	100.00
Republican hold			

=== District 23 ===
2022 Arkansas Senate election, 23rd district
Party	Candidate	Votes	%
Republican	Scott Flippo (incumbent)	23,951	79.73
Democratic	Derek Huber	6,088	20.27
Total votes		30,039	100.00

=== District 24 ===
2022 Arkansas Senate election, 24th district
Party	Candidate	Votes	%
Republican	Missy Irvin (incumbent)	28,789	100.00
Total votes		28,789	100.00
Republican hold			

=== District 25 ===
2022 Arkansas Senate election, 25th district
Party	Candidate	Votes	%
Republican	Breanne Davis (incumbent)	20,965	100.00
Total votes		20,965	100.00
Republican hold			

=== District 26 ===
2022 Arkansas Senate election, 26th district
Party	Candidate	Votes	%
Republican	Gary Stubblefield (incumbent)	21,272	83.78
Libertarian	Gabriel Andreuccetti	4,117	16.22
Total votes		25,389	100.00

=== District 27 ===
2022 Arkansas Senate election, 27th district
Party	Candidate	Votes	%
Republican	Justin Boyd	11,765	63.57
Democratic	Rebecca Ward	6,741	36.43
Total votes		18,506	100.00

=== District 28 ===
2022 Arkansas Senate election, 28th district
Party	Candidate	Votes	%
Republican	Bryan King	21,768	75.96
Democratic	Jim Wallace	6,888	24.04
Total votes		28,656	100.00

=== District 29 ===
2022 Arkansas Senate election, 29th district
Party	Candidate	Votes	%
Republican	Jim Petty	23,021	100.00
Total votes		23,021	100.00
Republican hold			

=== District 30 ===
2022 Arkansas Senate election, 30th district
Party	Candidate	Votes	%
Democratic	Greg Leding (incumbent)	19,226	100.00
Total votes		19,226	100.00
Democratic hold			

=== District 31 ===
2022 Arkansas Senate election, 31st district
Party	Candidate	Votes	%
Republican	Clint Penzo	10,265	60.13
Democratic	Lisa Parks	6,805	39.87
Total votes		17,070	100.00

=== District 32 ===
2022 Arkansas Senate election, 32nd district
Party	Candidate	Votes	%
Republican	Joshua Bryant	18,022	100.00
Total votes		18,022	100.00
Republican hold			

=== District 33 ===
2022 Arkansas Senate election, 33rd district
Party	Candidate	Votes	%
Republican	Bart Hester (incumbent)	21,122	100.00
Total votes		21,122	100.00
Republican hold			

=== District 34 ===
2022 Arkansas Senate election, 34th district
Party	Candidate	Votes	%
Republican	Jim Dotson	21,349	69.80
Libertarian	J.P. DeVilliers	9,236	30.20
Total votes		30,585	100.00

=== District 35 ===
2022 Arkansas Senate election, 35th district
Party	Candidate	Votes	%
Republican	Tyler Dees	18,411	73.68
Libertarian	Doug Peterson	6,578	26.32
Total votes		24,989	100.00

== See also ==
- 2022 Arkansas elections
- 2022 Arkansas House of Representatives election
- Arkansas Senate
- List of Arkansas General Assemblies
