= 2020 Arkansas Senate election =

- November 3, 2020

17 of 35 seats in the Arkansas Senate 18 seats needed for a majority
| | Majority party | Minority party |
|---|---|---|
| Leader | Jim Hendren | Keith Ingram |
| Party | Republican | Democratic |
| Leader since | January 14, 2019 | January 15, 2013 |
| Leader's seat | 1st | 24th |
| Seats before | 27 | 9 |
| Seats won | 15 | 2 |
| Seats after | 28 | 7 |
| Seat change | ▲2 | ▼2 |
| Popular vote | 372,240 | 144,986 |
| Percentage | 71.97% | 28.03% |
- Results of the elections: Republican gain Democratic hold Republican hold No election

The 2020 Arkansas Senate elections took place as part of the biennial 2020 United States elections. Arkansas voters elected state senators to the Arkansas Senate in 17 of the state's 35 senate districts. The primary elections on March 3, 2020, determined which candidates would appear on the November 3, 2020, general election ballot.

The outcome of this election was identified by the National Conference of State Legislatures as one of many that could affect partisan balance during post-Census redistricting.

Following the previous election in 2018, Republicans, led by Bart Hester (AR-01), had control of the Arkansas Senate with 26 seats to Democrats, led by Keith Ingram (AR-24), with nine seats. In the 2020 cycle, Republicans made a net gain of two seats, defeating two incumbent Democratic senators, bringing the partisan balance to a 28-7 supermajority.

== Composition ==
| Affiliation | Party (Shading indicates majority caucus) | | Total | |
| Affiliation | Republican | Democratic | Total | Vacant |
|---|---|---|---|---|
| Before Election | 26 | 9 | 35 | 0 |
| After Election | 28 | 7 | 35 | 0 |
| Change | ▲2 | ▼2 | | Steady |

== Predictions ==
| Source | Ranking | As of |
|---|---|---|
| The Cook Political Report | Safe R | October 21, 2020 |

== Summary ==
| District | Incumbent | Party | Elected Senator | Party |
|---|---|---|---|---|
| 1st | Bart Hester | Rep | Bart Hester | Rep |
| 2nd | Jim Hendren | Rep | Jim Hendren | Rep |
| 7th | Lance Eads | Rep | Lance Eads (Note: Did not face opposition in the general election.) | Rep |
| 11th | Jimmy Hickey Jr. | Rep | Jimmy Hickey Jr. | Rep |
| 12th | Bruce Maloch | Dem | Charles Beckham | Rep |
| 13th | Alan Clark | Rep | Alan Clark | Rep |
| 16th | Breanne Davis | Rep | Breanne Davis | Rep |
| 21st | John Cooper (Note: Not up for reelection; therefore this seat is open.) | Rep | Dan Sullivan | Rep |
| 22nd | Dave Wallace | Rep | Dave Wallace | Rep |
| 23rd | Ron Caldwell | Rep | Ron Caldwell | Rep |
| 25th | Stephanie Flowers | Dem | Stephanie Flowers | Dem |
| 26th | Eddie Cheatham | Dem | Ben Gilmore | Rep |
| 27th | Trent Garner | Rep | Trent Garner | Rep |
| 28th | Jonathan Dismang | Rep | Jonathan Dismang | Rep |
| 29th | Ricky Hill | Rep | Ricky Hill | Rep |
| 32nd | Will Bond | Dem | Clarke Tucker | Dem |
| 34th | Jane English | Rep | Jane English | Rep |

=== Closest races ===
Seats where the margin of victory was under 10%:

1. District 34, 7.52%

== Detailed results ==
=== District 1 ===
2020 Arkansas Senate election, 1st district
| Party | Candidate | Votes | % |
|---|---|---|---|
| Republican | Bart Hester (incumbent) | 36,778 | 64.94% |
| Democratic | Ronetta J. Francis | 19,855 | 35.06% |
| Majority | | 16,923 | 29.88% |
| Total votes | | 56,633 | 100% |
| Republican hold | | | |

=== District 2 ===
2020 Arkansas Senate election, 2nd district
| Party | Candidate | Votes | % |
|---|---|---|---|
| Republican | Jim Hendren (incumbent) | 32,705 | 73.44% |
| Democratic | Ryan Craig | 11,825 | 26.56% |
| Majority | | 20,880 | 46.88% |
| Total votes | | 44,530 | 100% |
| Republican hold | | | |

=== District 7 ===
2020 Arkansas Senate election, 7th district
| Party | Candidate | Votes | % |
|---|---|---|---|
| Republican | Lance Eads (incumbent) | 24,563 | 100% |
| Majority | | 24,563 | 100% |
| Total votes | | 24,563 | 100% |
| Republican hold | | | |

=== District 11 ===
2020 Arkansas Senate election, 11th district
| Party | Candidate | Votes | % |
|---|---|---|---|
| Republican | Jimmy Hickey Jr. (incumbent) | 21,058 | 100% |
| Majority | | 21,058 | 100% |
| Total votes | | 21,058 | 100% |
| Republican hold | | | |

=== District 12 ===
2020 Arkansas Senate election, 12th district
| Party | Candidate | Votes | % |
|---|---|---|---|
| Republican | Charles Beckham | 17,282 | 55.89% |
| Democratic | Bruce Maloch (incumbent) | 13,641 | 44.11% |
| Majority | | 3,641 | 11.78% |
| Total votes | | 30,923 | 100% |
| Republican gain from Democratic | | | |

=== District 13 ===
2020 Arkansas Senate election, 13th district
| Party | Candidate | Votes | % |
|---|---|---|---|
| Republican | Alan Clark (incumbent) | 26,069 | 75.19% |
| Democratic | Brandon Overly | 8,604 | 24.81% |
| Majority | | 17,465 | 50.38% |
| Total votes | | 34,673 | 100% |
| Republican hold | | | |

=== District 16 ===
2020 Arkansas Senate election, 16th district
| Party | Candidate | Votes | % |
|---|---|---|---|
| Republican | Breanne Davis (incumbent) | 27,639 | 100% |
| Majority | | 27,639 | 100% |
| Total votes | | 27,639 | 100% |
| Republican hold | | | |

=== District 21 ===
2020 Arkansas Senate election, 21st district
| Party | Candidate | Votes | % |
|---|---|---|---|
| Republican | Dan Sullivan | 28,542 | 100% |
| Majority | | 28,542 | 100% |
| Total votes | | 28,542 | 100% |
| Republican hold | | | |

=== District 22 ===
2020 Arkansas Senate election, 22nd district
| Party | Candidate | Votes | % |
|---|---|---|---|
| Republican | Dave Wallace (incumbent) | 20,406 | 100% |
| Majority | | 20,406 | 100% |
| Total votes | | 20,406 | 100% |
| Republican hold | | | |

=== District 23 ===
2020 Arkansas Senate election, 23rd district
| Party | Candidate | Votes | % |
|---|---|---|---|
| Republican | Ronald Caldwell (incumbent) | 17,538 | 100% |
| Majority | | 17,538 | 100% |
| Total votes | | 17,538 | 100% |
| Republican hold | | | |

=== District 25 ===
2020 Arkansas Senate election, 25th district
| Party | Candidate | Votes | % |
|---|---|---|---|
| Democratic | Stephanie Flowers (incumbent) | 19,737 | 100% |
| Majority | | 19,737 | 100% |
| Total votes | | 19,737 | 100% |
| Democratic hold | | | |

=== District 26 ===
2020 Arkansas Senate election, 26th district
| Party | Candidate | Votes | % |
|---|---|---|---|
| Republican | Ben Gilmore | 17,732 | 60.06% |
| Democratic | Eddie L. Cheatham (incumbent) | 11,791 | 39.94% |
| Majority | | 5,941 | 20.12% |
| Total votes | | 29,523 | 100% |
| Republican gain from Democratic | | | |

=== District 27 ===
2020 Arkansas Senate election, 27th district
| Party | Candidate | Votes | % |
|---|---|---|---|
| Republican | Trent Garner (incumbent) | 19,892 | 61.08% |
| Democratic | Keidra Burrell | 1,267 | 38.92% |
| Majority | | 7,215 | 22.16% |
| Total votes | | 32,569 | 100% |
| Republican hold | | | |

=== District 28 ===
2020 Arkansas Senate election, 28th district
| Party | Candidate | Votes | % |
|---|---|---|---|
| Republican | Jonathan Dismang (incumbent) | 14,169 | 100% |
| Majority | | 14,169 | 100% |
| Total votes | | 14,169 | 100% |
| Republican hold | | | |

=== District 29 ===
2020 Arkansas Senate election, 29th district
| Party | Candidate | Votes | % |
|---|---|---|---|
| Republican | Ricky Hill (incumbent) | 31,111 | 100% |
| Majority | | 31,111 | 100% |
| Total votes | | 31,111 | 100% |
| Republican hold | | | |

=== District 32 ===
2020 Arkansas Senate election, 32nd district
| Party | Candidate | Votes | % |
|---|---|---|---|
| Democratic | Clarke Tucker | 28,481 | 64.92% |
| Republican | Bob Thomas | 15,392 | 35.08% |
| Majority | | 13,089 | 29.84% |
| Total votes | | 43,873 | 100% |
| Democratic hold | | | |

=== District 34 ===
2020 Arkansas Senate election, 34th district
| Party | Candidate | Votes | % |
|---|---|---|---|
| Republican | Jane English (incumbent) | 21,364 | 53.76% |
| Democratic | Alisa Blaize Dixon | 18,375 | 46.24% |
| Majority | | 2,989 | 7.52% |
| Total votes | | 39,739 | 100% |
| Republican hold | | | |

== See also ==
- 2020 Arkansas elections
- 2020 Arkansas House of Representatives election
- Arkansas Senate
