= 2018 Arkansas Senate election =

- November 6, 2018

18 out of 35 seats in the Arkansas Senate 18 seats needed for a majority
- Turnout: 50.38%

	Majority party	Minority party
Leader	Jonathan Dismang	Keith Ingram
Party	Republican	Democratic
Leader since	January 15, 2015	January 15, 2013
Leader's seat	District 28	District 24
Last election	26	9
Seats after	26	9
Seat change	Steady	Steady
President Pro Tempore before election
Jonathan Dismang
Republican
Elected President Pro Tempore
Jim Hendren
Republican

The 2018 Arkansas Senate election was held on November 6, 2018, to determine which party would control the Arkansas Senate for the following two years in the 92nd Arkansas General Assembly. Eighteen out of 35 seats in the Arkansas Senate were up for election and the primary occurred on May 22, 2018. Prior to the election, 26 seats were held by Republicans and 9 seats were held by Democrats. The general election saw neither party gain nor lose any seats, meaning that Republicans retained their majority in the State Senate.

== Predictions ==
Source	Ranking	As of
Governing	Safe R	October 8, 2018

== Retirements ==
=== Democrats ===
1. District 4: Uvalde Lindsey retired.

=== Republicans ===
1. District 15: David J. Sanders retired.
2. District 33: Jeremy Young Hutchinson resigned on August 31, 2018, after being indicted by a federal grand jury on 12 wire and tax fraud charges.

== Defeated incumbents ==
=== In primary ===
==== Republicans ====
1. District 5: Bryan King lost renomination to Bob Ballinger.
2. District 8: Frank Glidewell lost renomination to Mathew Pitsch.

== Results ==
=== District 3 ===
District 3 election, 2018
Party	Candidate	Votes	%
Republican	Cecile Bledsoe (incumbent)	14,598	61.94%
Democratic	Jon Comstock	8,968	38.06%
Total votes		23,566	100.0%
Republican hold			

=== District 4 ===
District 4 election, 2018
Party	Candidate	Votes	%
Democratic	Greg Leding	18,416	61.49%
Republican	Dawn Clemence	11,533	38.51%
Total votes		29,949	100.0%
Democratic hold			

=== District 5 ===
District 5 election, 2018
Party	Candidate	Votes	%
Republican	Bob Ballinger	18,288	67.61%
Democratic	Jim Wallace	7,872	29.11%
Libertarian	Lee Evans	887	3.28%
Total votes		27,047	100.0%
Republican hold			

=== District 6 ===
District 6 election, 2018
Party	Candidate	Votes	%
Republican	Gary Stubblefield (incumbent)		100.0%
Total votes			100.0%
Republican hold			

=== District 8 ===
District 8 election, 2018
Party	Candidate	Votes	%
Republican	Mathew Pitsch	18,365	76.32%
Libertarian	William Whitfield Hyman	5,698	23.68%
Total votes		24,063	100.0%
Republican hold			

=== District 9 ===
District 9 election, 2018
Party	Candidate	Votes	%
Republican	Terry Rice (incumbent)		100.0%
Total votes			100.0%
Republican hold			

=== District 10 ===
District 10 election, 2018
Party	Candidate	Votes	%
Democratic	Larry Teague (incumbent)	13,266	62.41%
Libertarian	Dawn Clemence	7,989	37.59%
Total votes		21,255	100.0%
Democratic hold			

=== District 14 ===
District 14 election, 2018
Party	Candidate	Votes	%
Republican	Bill Sample (incumbent)	21,913	69.68%
Democratic	Michael Colgrove	9,536	30.32%
Total votes		31,449	100.0%
Republican hold			

=== District 15 ===
District 15 election, 2018
Party	Candidate	Votes	%
Republican	Mark Johnson		100.0%
Total votes			100.0%
Republican hold			

=== District 17 ===
District 17 election, 2018
Party	Candidate	Votes	%
Republican	Scott Flippo (incumbent)	21,156	79.90%
Libertarian	Kevin Vornheder	5,321	20.10%
Total votes		26,477	100.0%
Republican hold			

=== District 18 ===
District 18 election, 2018
Party	Candidate	Votes	%
Republican	Missy Irvin (incumbent)		100.0%
Total votes			100.0%
Republican hold			

=== District 19 ===
District 19 election, 2018
Party	Candidate	Votes	%
Republican	James Sturch	18,563	72.86%
Democratic	Susi Epperson	6,914	27.14%
Total votes		25,477	100.0%
Republican hold			

=== District 20 ===
District 20 election, 2018
Party	Candidate	Votes	%
Republican	Blake Johnson (incumbent)		100.0%
Total votes			100.0%
Republican hold			

=== District 24 ===
District 24 election, 2018
Party	Candidate	Votes	%
Democratic	Keith Ingram (incumbent)		100.0%
Total votes			100.0%
Democratic hold			

=== District 30 ===
District 30 election, 2018
Party	Candidate	Votes	%
Democratic	Linda Chesterfield (incumbent)		100.0%
Total votes			100.0%
Democratic hold			

=== District 31 ===
District 31 election, 2018
Party	Candidate	Votes	%
Democratic	Joyce Elliott (incumbent)		100.0%
Total votes			100.0%
Democratic hold			

=== District 33 ===
District 33 election, 2018
Party	Candidate	Votes	%
Republican	Kim Hammer	23,014	68.35%
Democratic	Melissa Fults	10,657	31.65%
Total votes		33,671	100.0%
Republican hold			

=== District 35 ===
District 35 election, 2018
Party	Candidate	Votes	%
Republican	Jason Rapert (incumbent)	15,168	55.14%
Democratic	Maureen Skinner	12,339	44.86%
Total votes		27,507	100.0%
Republican hold			
