= Allison Sweatman =

American politician

Member-elect of the Arkansas Senate from the 13th district
- Assuming office January 2027
- Succeeding: Jane English

Personal details
- Party: Democratic
- Spouse: Andrew Sweatman
- Children: 2

Allison Grigsby Sweatman is an American politician. She is the Democratic member-elect of the Arkansas Senate from the 13th district, succeeding Jane English. Prior to her victory, she was a Christian missionary and social worker.

== Biography ==
Sweatman was born in Little Rock to Jerry and restaurant owner Bridget Sweatman. After graduating from Cabot High School, she obtained her bachelor's degree from Ouachita Baptist University in 2012 and her graduate degree from Tulane University in 2020. She and her husband worked as Christian missionaries in Xi'an. She works as a social worker and mental health professional. She was a legislative editor at the 93rd Arkansas General Assembly.

Sweatman served as president of the Young Democrats of Arkansas. She ran as the Democratic candidate in Arkansas's 13th Senate district in the 2022 election, losing to Republican incumbent Jane English 44.3% to 52.5%. She opposed a universal voucher program due to concerns that this would defund public schools other special needs students would have to attend due to physical proximity issues. In 2024, she volunteered for a failed attempt to put an abortion rights amendment on the state ballot.

In August 2025, Sweatman announced a second run in the 13th Senate district in next year's election, succeeding the now term-limited English. She won the Democratic primary in March 2026, defeating Jason Williams 54.7% to 45.3%. Despite her campaign's financial disadvantage, she won the general election in November 2026, defeating the Republican candidate, state representative Brandon Achor.

Sweatman lives in North Little Rock with her husband Andrew Sweatman and two children. Both of her children have Down syndrome.
