= Jason Rapert =

American politician

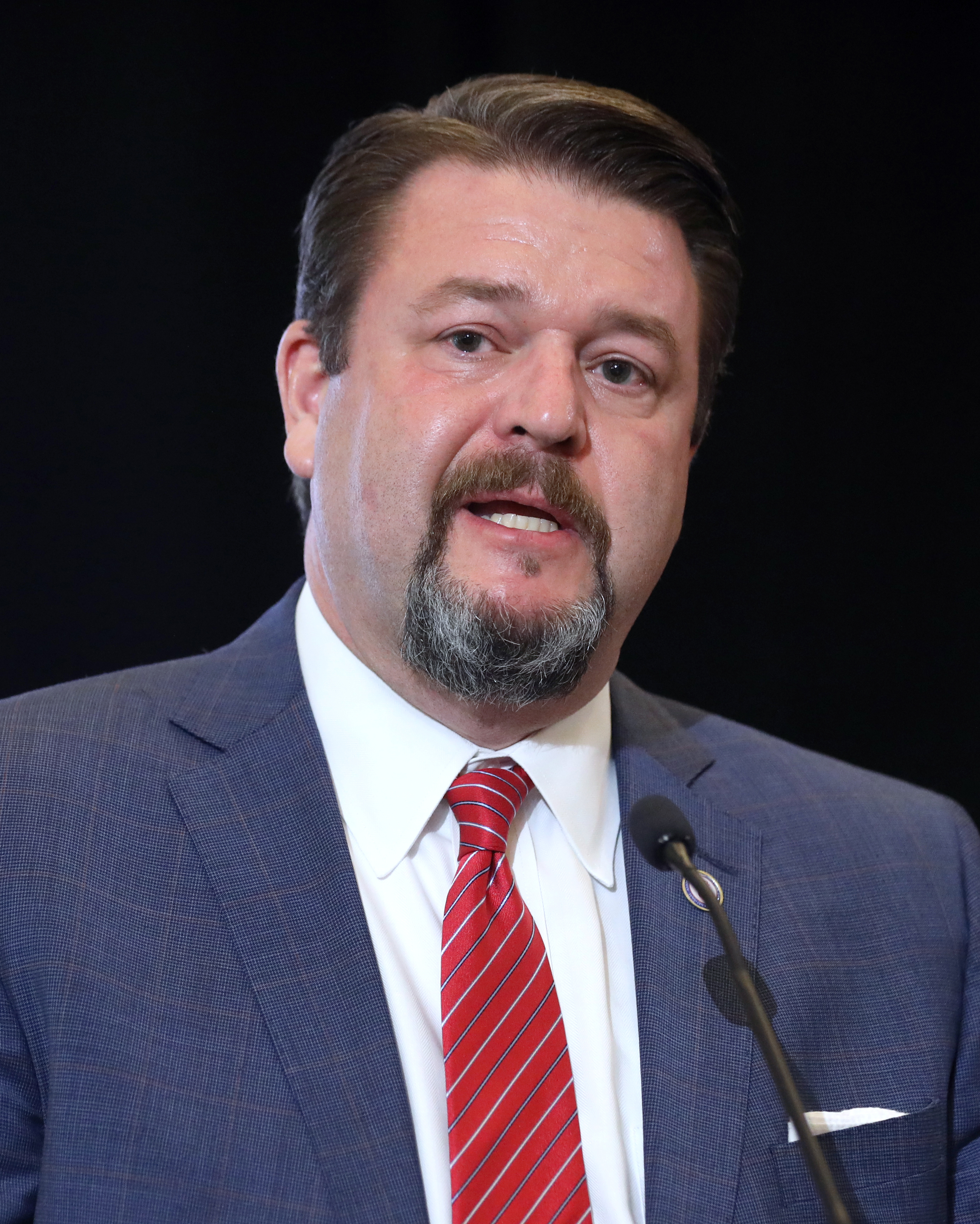

Member of the Arkansas Senate from the 35th district
- In office January 15, 2013 – January 15, 2023
- Preceded by: Bill Pritchard

Member of the Arkansas Senate from the 18th district
- In office January 10, 2011 – January 15, 2013
- Preceded by: Bob Johnson
- Succeeded by: Missy Irvin

Personal details
- Born: Stanley Jason Rapert; April 3, 1972 (age 54) Pocahontas, Arkansas, U.S.
- Party: Republican
- Spouse: Laurie Tyler (m. 1990)
- Children: 2
- Education: University of Central Arkansas

Stanley Jason Rapert (born April 3, 1972) is an American politician from the state of Arkansas. A member of the Republican Party, he was a member of the Arkansas State Senate from 2011 to 2023, representing the 18th district and then the 35th district.

== Early life, education, and career ==
In 1990, Rapert married Laurie Ellen Tyler of Pocahontas in Randolph County and a member of the Jarrett Tribe Family. The couple moved to Conway, where they both attended the University of Central Arkansas, where he majored in Political Science and Sociology. He worked for United Parcel Service while attending college.

Rapert is the founder and president of Holy Ghost Ministries. A 2012 profile in a local newspaper reported that he made annual missionary visits to Ghana.

== State Senate (2011–2023) ==
Rapert was elected in 2010 to the Arkansas State Senate, representing the 18th district. As a result of decennial redistricting, he sought reelection in the 35th district in 2012, when he defeated Democrat Linda Tyler. In the general election held on November 4, 2014, Rapert won a four-year term in the state Senate by defeating Democrat Joel Pearson, 13,483 votes to 10,267.

Rapert is a member of the conservative American Legislative Exchange Council (ALEC).

Rapert has embraced the label of Christian nationalist. In 2019, Rapert founded the National Association of Christian Lawmakers (NACL), a far-right group that seeks to dismantle separation of church and state. In an interview in 2023, Rapert described America as a country that had "reached a level of debauchery and immorality that is at biblical proportions." He recruited influential figures of the Christian right, including Mike Huckabee, Bob McEwen, and Tony Perkins, to join the group's advisory board.

In 2017, Rapert introduced legislation to remove the names of the Clintons from the Bill and Hillary Clinton National Airport in Little Rock.

=== Reproductive rights ===
Rapert supports banning abortion without exceptions for rape, incest, or the health of the mother.

In 2013, Rapert authored a bill to ban all abortions in Arkansas after twelve weeks of pregnancy. Then-Governor Mike Beebe (D) vetoed the bill as unconstitutional, but Republican-majority Legislature overrode the veto. In 2013, a federal judge stopped the law from being implemented, saying it was likely unconstitutional. In January 2016, the U.S. Supreme Court denied the State's petition for a writ of certiorari to review the case. The State of Arkansas was ordered to pay over $97,000 in attorneys' fees and costs to the prevailing plaintiffs before the Supreme Court decision was finalized.

=== Minorities ===
At a 2011 Tea Party rally, Rapert said, "we're not going to allow minorities to run roughshod over what you people believe in". Rapert later claimed that his remarks about minorities were taken out of context. The "minority" comments Rapert made in 2011 referenced both Barack Obama and a ballot initiative (Arkansas Proposed Initiative Act No. 1 (2008)) stricken as unconstitutional that prohibited unmarried cohabitating couples from adopting. The Arkansas act had been criticized for prohibiting gay couples from adopting.

On June 30, 2015, the Jason Rapert for Arkansas Senate Facebook page announced, in response to a post suggesting that the rights of minorities are not subject to majority wishes, that "we the majority grant you rights by choice." Later on that same day, the Facebook page accused Max Brantley and the Arkansas Times as a whole, of reporting that Rapert does not "recognize God has endowed us with natural rights that are given by God that no man can take away."

=== LGBT issues ===
While running for the Arkansas General Assembly, Rapert stated: "Traditional marriage in our society has always been between one man and one woman. I support an amendment to the U.S. Constitution that protects that right now and forevermore." As a member of the Arkansas Legislative Council, a powerful committee in the Arkansas General Assembly, Rapert proposed a non-binding resolution to "urge the Arkansas Supreme Court to overturn a circuit judge’s ruling striking down Arkansas’ same-sex marriage ban." Rapert initially proposed impeaching the judge who issued the ruling, but later stated he wanted to establish a system of judicial recall.

On June 7, 2015, Rapert took to Facebook to "urge everyone to contact the Conway City Council and Mayor Tab Townsell in opposition to allowing activists to march through the streets of Conway on a Sunday to mock Christian values and accuse Christians of being bigots", in protest of the Conway Gay Pride Parade that was scheduled to take place later that same day, which he deemed an anti-Christian activity. According to The Chicago Sun-Times, responses to the Facebook post were "largely mocking".

Following the U.S. Supreme Court's ruling in Obergefell v. Hodges, which recognized a constitutional right to same-sex marriage, Rapert claimed that the Court's ruling was unconstitutional. Rapert encouraged public officials "to refuse to comply with an unjust ruling that violates religious freedom and states rights".

In 2017, Rapert took to Facebook and compared LGBT people to the Nazis, stating that "LGBT activists ... demand full compliance with their diminished morality. They clearly behave just like the 'brown shirts' and 'SS' troops."

In January 2020, Rapert suggested cutting funding for PBS and AETN (Arkansas PBS) for the appearance of gay actor Billy Porter on Sesame Street, saying: "I can pass a bill to cutoff all funding for the rebroadcast of PBS programming through AETN and also stop all funding for AETN altogether if necessary". A Facebook commenter asked "if Jesus would approve of your judgment and intolerance?" To which he replied: "You are totally amiss and you know it. Christians do not support anti-Biblical behavior. The Bible is clear on certain sins — including homosexuality. Romans Chapter 1 and the Book of Jude just to cite two examples are very clear about this issue. Jesus never endorsed homosexual behavior and opposed it as he referenced Sodom and Gomorrah. Speaking the truth is not hatred. If you oppose the Bible, you are not a sincere Christian."

In February 2023, Rapert said on an episode of Save The Nation that the Christians must take authority over "the drag queens running this place", stating that: "We must take authority, God told us to go out there and be fruitful, multiply, fill the Earth, subdue it, and have dominion over everything. Friends, the reason the country is struggling because the Christians in America have failed to take authority and now is the time to choose, now is the time to stand."

=== Medical marijuana ===
In November 2016, Arkansas became the first state in the Bible Belt to legalize medical marijuana; a ballot referendum to legalize marijuana for medical use passed by nearly 70,000 votes. Rapert opposed the campaign; he introduced legislation to ban the consumption of medical marijuana in smoked form, and to delay legalization as long as federal laws continued to ban marijuana. When asked whether it was hypocritical for him to oppose medical marijuana in favor of federal law, while opposing marriage equality in spite of federal law, he responded with "Watch your language with me or we'll stop the interview".

=== Ten Commandments monuments ===
Rapert pushed for the installation of a privately funded Ten Commandments Monument on the grounds of the Arkansas State Capitol. Rapert sponsored a bill in 2015 which would require the secretary of state to allow for the installation of the monument. The monument was challenged by the ACLU as being a violation of clauses in both the federal and state constitutions prohibiting the government from favoring any religion. The first version of the monument was installed in 2017, and was destroyed less than 24 hours later.

Legal challenges were suspended until a replacement monument could be installed. The new version, with protective concrete bollards, was unveiled April 27, 2018. The monument was again challenged by the ACLU, the Arkansas Society of Freethinkers, and The Satanic Temple. The Satanic Temple had successfully challenged a similar monument in Oklahoma in 2015, and in both locations has offered to install a bronze monument to Baphomet as a symbol of religious pluralism and freedom.

=== Comments on nuclear weapons ===
In February 2015, Rapert stated that the United States should use nuclear weapons in response to the threat posed by the Islamic State of Iraq and the Levant. The post sparked a "lively debate...rang[ing] from agreement to ridicule" on social media: Wonkette replied sarcastically to this stance, as did Daily Kos, and Esquire.

=== Social media ===
In early September 2015, after having been approached by a local constituent at a store, Rapert posted a tweet that read, "Not smart to come up and harass somebody in a parking lot who's carrying a handgun. Better be glad you decided to walk away #armed&ready", which became the center of a controversy on social media. Rapert said that the tweet was not referring to the incident with that constituent.

In February 2019, the sludge metal band Eyehategod posted a Facebook event for a show booked in Little Rock that used a picture of Rapert eating a baby, and Rapert spoke out, calling for a protest of the venue and the band, saying "I call on Vinos in Little Rock to cancel this event and apologize for such a disrespectful image that shows the dehumanization of babies lives. It is disrespectful of all who value babies lives and people of faith" and urged the band to find the "love, grace and mercy of God and choose to update their name to 'EyeloveGod'" in a later update to his post.

==== Social media lawsuit ====
In 2018, after Rapert blocked several critics on his Twitter and Facebook accounts, the group American Atheists sued Rapert, alleging that the blocking violated constituents' First and Fourteenth Amendment rights. In 2022, Rapert settled the suit; as part of the settlement, he was required to unblock the accounts, and the State of Arkansas paid $16,291 to cover the plaintiffs' legal fees.

== Campaign for lieutenant governor ==
In August 2019, Rapert said he would seek the Republican nomination for lieutenant governor of Arkansas in the 2022 election. A crowded field of other Republicans also ran, including Arkansas Attorney General Leslie Rutledge; Doyle Webb, the chairman of the state Republican Party; Greg Bledsoe, the state surgeon general; Joseph K. Wood, the county judge of Washington County; and Chris Bequette, an attorney. Rutledge defeated Rapert in the Republican primary election.

== State Library Board (2023–2025) ==
In December 2023, Governor Sarah Huckabee Sanders appointed Rapart to the seven-member Arkansas State Library Board, for a term expiring on October 18, 2029. The state Senate confirmed Rapert's appointment on a 22–10 vote; all six Democratic senators, as well as four of Rapert's Republican former colleagues (Jimmy Hickey Jr., Bryan King, Breanne Davis, and Jane English), voted against confirming him. While a board member, Rapert promoted the book banning movement. In 2024, after the board rejected Rapert's proposals to defund libraries that did not restrict circulation of works he found objectionable, Rapert said of his fellow board members: "You probably should be tarred and feathered. That's what they used to do in America." In April 2025, the Arkansas legislature approved a bill to abolish the library board, supported by Rapert. Arkansas governor Sarah Huckabee Sanders has since appointed new board members, minus Rapert.

== Personal life ==
Rapert and his wife have two daughters. He plays the fiddle, which he learned by ear when he was ten years old.

In July 2020, during COVID-19 pandemic, Rapert was hospitalized with pneumonia due to COVID-19.

Rapert is a member of the Gideons International and Rotary International.
