= Senator Flippo =

Senator Flippo may refer to:

- Ronnie Flippo (born 1937), Alabama State Senate
- Scott Flippo (born 1979), Arkansas State Senate
