= Jim Petty =

American politician

Member of the Arkansas Senate from the 29th district
- Incumbent
- Assumed office January 9, 2023
- Preceded by: redistricted

Personal details
- Party: Republican

Jim Petty is an American politician. He serves in the Arkansas Senate representing the 29th district.

== Life and career ==
Petty was a businessperson. He was also a member of the Van Buren City Council.

In May 2022, Petty defeated Warren Robertson in the Republican primary election for the 29th district of the Arkansas Senate. No candidate was nominated to challenge him in the general election. He succeeded Ricky Hill.
