= Senator Garner =

Senator Garner may refer to:

- Trent Garner (fl. 2010s–2020s), Arkansas State Senate
- Wayne Garner (born 1951), Georgia State Senate
