= Justin Boyd (politician) =

American politician

Member of the Arkansas Senate from the 27th district
- Incumbent
- Assumed office January 9, 2023
- Preceded by: redistricted

Member of the Arkansas House of Representatives from the 77th district
- In office January 12, 2015 – January 9, 2023
- Preceded by: Stephanie Malone
- Succeeded by: redistricted

Personal details
- Party: Republican
- Spouse: Lori Boyd
- Children: 3
- Education: University of Arkansas–Fort Smith; University of Arkansas for Medical Sciences College of Pharmacy; Sam M. Walton College of Business

Justin Boyd is an American politician. He serves as a Republican member for the 27th district of the Arkansas Senate. He also served as a member for the 77th district of the Arkansas House of Representatives.

== Life and career ==
Boyd attended the University of Arkansas–Fort Smith, the University of Arkansas for Medical Sciences College of Pharmacy and Sam M. Walton College of Business.

In 2015, Boyd was elected to represent the 77th district of the Arkansas House of Representatives, succeeding Stephanie Malone. He served until 2022, when he sought election to the Arkansas Senate.

In May 2022, Boyd defeated Kelly Procter Pierce in the Republican primary election for the 27th district of the Arkansas Senate. In November 2022, he defeated Becky Ward in the general election, winning 63 percent of the votes. He assumed office in the 94th Arkansas General Assembly on January 9, 2023.

On March 11, 2025, Boyd was one of the few Republicans who voted against a nitrogen hypoxia death penalty method bill.
