= Matt Stone (politician) =

American politician

Member of the Arkansas Senate from the 2nd district
- Incumbent
- Assumed office January 9, 2023
- Preceded by: redistricted

Personal details
- Party: Republican
- Education: University of Arkansas at Monticello; University of Arkansas

Matt Stone is an American politician. He serves as a Republican member for the 2nd district of the Arkansas Senate.

== Life and career ==
Stone attended the University of Arkansas at Monticello and the University of Arkansas.

In May 2022, Stone defeated Beth Callaway and James McMenis in the Republican primary election for the 2nd district of the Arkansas Senate. In November 2022, he defeated Garry Smith in the general election, winning 67 percent of the votes. He assumed office in 2023.
