= Tyler Dees =

American politician

Member of the Arkansas Senate from the 35th district
- Incumbent
- Assumed office January 9, 2023
- Preceded by: Jim Hendren

Personal details
- Party: Republican
- Spouse: Meagan Dees (m. 2007)
- Children: 3
- Education: John Brown University

Tyler Dees is an American politician representing part of Northwest Arkansas in the Arkansas Senate since 2023.

== Life and career ==
Dees attended John Brown University. He is a businessperson working in retail for Simmons Foods.

Longtime member of the Arkansas General Assembly Jim Hendren (Independent) announced his retirement in 2022, opening a vacancy in the 35th district, which had recently been renumbered from the 2nd district during redistricting. Dees ran against Jeff Tennant and State Representative Gayla Hendren McKenzie in the March 2022 Republican primary. The race went to a runoff election, when Dees defeated McKenzie to win the Republican nomination.

In November 2022, Dees defeated Libertarian Doug Peterson in the general election, winning 73 percent of the votes. He was seated on January 9, 2023 in the 94th Arkansas General Assembly.
