= Bradley D. Simon =

American lawyer

Bradley D. Simon (born June 4, 1956) is an American criminal defense attorney, known for his representation of individuals involved in public corruption cases, most notably the former New York State Comptroller Alan Hevesi.

== Early life ==
Simon was born in New York City. He received his Bachelor of Art's degree, Cum Laude from Harvard in 1978. He received a Juris Doctor degree from Georgetown University Law Center in 1981.

== Professional career ==
After working as a law firm associate in private practice in New York, Simon became a Trial Attorney with the U.S. Department of Justice Justice Department in 1987. In 1990 Simon was sworn in as an Assistant U.S. Attorney for the Eastern District of New York where he served until 1998. Later that year he founded Simon & Partners LLP a boutique white collar criminal defense and civil litigation law firm which operated in New York for twenty one years until 2019. After Simon & Partners closed, Simon joined the law firm Windels Marx Lane & Mittendorf as a partner. A press release issued on January 2, 2022 by the New York law firm Schlam Stone & Dolan announced that Simon had joined the firm as a partner. The press release mentioned Simon's relationship with the firm going back decades and his close professional relationship with the firm's founders, Harvey Stone and the late Peter Schlam.

Simon currently serves as an instructor at Yale University where he teaches an undergraduate course on White Collar Crime. He has served as an adjunct professor at St. John's University and Fordham Law School and has taught trial advocacy at Emory Law School in Atlanta. He is a member and frequent speaker at the International Section of the American Bar Association, the International Bar Association ("IBA") and the Union International de Avocats ("UIA").

== Notable cases ==
=== Alan Hevesi: 2007-2012 ===
Simon represented the former New York State Comptroller, Alan Hevesi, in an investigation conducted by New York State Attorney General, Andrew Cuomo, alleging Hevesi mishandled money from the New York State Pension Fund. Regarding Alan Hevesi's decision to hire Brad Simon to represent him in the Attorney General's investigation, The New York Times said “Mr. Hevesi changed lawyers this week and signaled a far more public and combative strategy. His new lawyer, Bradley D. Simon, has represented people caught up in public cases before, including David Chang, a businessman who was a key figure in allegations of improprieties raised about Robert G. Torricelli, the former United States senator from New Jersey.” In a tense exchange between Simon and then Attorney General Cuomo, Simon complained that the Attorney General's Office was leaking information regarding the investigation. For over three years, Hevesi fought the charges aggressively. In September 2010, however, he decided to give up the fight and plead guilty. According to The New York Times, "it appears that it was the fate of Mr. Hevesi’s two son’s, Assemblyman Andrew Hevesi and former State Senator Daniel Heveis, that led him to accept the plea deal."

=== Trump litigation: 2015-2018 ===
Simon represented New York real estate developer Jody Kriss in a one hundred million dollar RICO action involving several Trump properties in New York, Florida and Arizona. The suit, pending in the United States District Court for the Southern District of New York was against Bayrock Group, a real estate development firm which partnered with former president Donald Trump in various real estate projects and one of Bayrock's principals, Felix Sater, the Russian businessman at the epicenter of the Trump Russia inquiry.

=== Morris Talansky: 2008-2010 ===
Simon represented Morris Talansky, the New York businessman at the center of the corruption case against Israeli Prime Minister Ehud Olmert, which led to his expected resignation in September 2008. Simon represented Talansky in a US investigation that came as a result of incriminating testimony that Talansky gave to Israeli authorities in questioning related to the Prime Minister's alleged wrongdoing. Talansky had been asked to give his final interview with Israeli authorities on August 31, 2008, but per Simon's counsel, did not plan to leave the United States.

As a result of Simon's advice not to return for questioning, the Israeli government sought immunity for Talansky in the US.

The New York Times noted in a February 28, 2009 story, "Mr. Talansky was supposed to return in September so that Mr. Olmert’s lawyers could complete their cross-examination. But Talansky’s courtroom testimony in Israel resulted in an investigation in the United States, where he is suspected of money laundering, tax evasion and bribery of a foreign official, although he has not been charged.

Talansky denies all the accusations. But his lawyer, Simon, has advised him not to return to Israel, fearing that his testimony there could further incriminate him in America.

The United States Justice Department agreed in January to grant Talansky partial immunity, saying that future testimony he provided in Israel would not be offered as evidence against him in the United States. Yet the Justice Department said the testimony could be used in other ways, including obtaining leads to other evidence, rendering the deal useless in Simon’s eyes.

In early February, Simon met with the state prosecutors in Israel to try to agree on terms whereby Talansky could testify without worsening his situation back home."

Notwithstanding Simon's advice, Talansky returned to Israel on June 28, 2009, to resume testimony. The Jerusalem Post noted in its June 28, 2009 story that "the key witness [Talansky] in the cash envelopes investigation of Olmert told the court that he returned to Israel despite the objections of his American lawyer Bradley Simon. Talansky told the court that Simon had warned that the Americans would 'eat him up' if he continued his pretrial testimony in Israel. From earlier correspondence between Simon and the Israeli authorities, it was clear that the Americans were investigating Talansky on some of the same issues that are under investigation in Israel."

To date, Talanasky has not been charged in either the United States or Israel.

=== Jeffrey Tesler: 2009-2013 ===
Simon represented Jeffrey Tesler, a London-based British Solicitor following his indictment in Houston Texas for violating the Foreign Corrupt Practices Act. (“FCPA”). Tesler was charged with paying bribes to Nigerian government officials on behalf of Halliburton Inc and its then subsidiary, Kellogg Brown Root during the time that former Vice President Dick Cheney was the chief executive officer of Halliburton. The bribes were allegedly paid by Tesler to assist Halliburton and its joint venture partners, obtain more than $6 billion in contracts to build liquefied natural gas facilities, on Bonny Island, off the southern coast of Nigeria. In March 2011, Tesler waived extradition and entered a guilty plea before U.S. District Judge Keith P. Ellison in Houston. Judge Ellison subsequently sentenced Tesler to a prison term of twenty one months, rejecting the government's arguments for a 78-month sentence. Simon successfully petitioned for a prison transfer for Tesler so that he could serve his sentence in the U.K. Tesler was released by U.K. authorities shortly after arriving on British soil.

=== David Rubin: 2011-2014 ===
Simon represented David Rubin, president and chief executive officer of CDR Financial Products Inc., a Beverly Hills financial services company. Rubin, CDR and others were charged in a federal indictment alleging a bid rigging conspiracy in the municipal bond market and other anti-trust violations. It was Rubin's campaign contributions to New Mexico governor Bill Richardson which derailed President Obama's selection of Richardson to be Commerce Secretary in 2009.

In December 2011, Simon filed a Writ of Mandamus with the U.S. Court of Appeals for the Second Circuit after the trial Judge, U.S. District Judge Victor Marrero, denied Simon's request to have the trial postponed due to the deteriorating medical condition of Rubin's wife. Rubin subsequently entered a guilty plea indicating that he could not leave his wife at their home in Los Angeles to attend his two-month trial.

Simon and his firm filed a 106-page sentencing memorandum before the new judge, U.S. District Judge Kimba Wood, asking for a sentence of probation. The government countered with a request for a nineteen-year prison sentence. Judge Wood sided with Simon, prompting criticism from many who argued that the sentence was far too lenient and that Rubin, who was able to afford high-priced counsel, should not be spared prison while others less culpable were incarcerated. Forbes Magazine, in reporting on Rubin's sentencing stated: “In this case, Rubin got as good a deal as he could have hoped for, but others will serve his prison time.”

=== David Chang: 2000-2003 ===
He has been sought after to represent individuals involved in high-profile legal matters such as David Chang – a central figure in the litigation that led to the resignation of the former United States Senator from New Jersey, Robert G. Torricelli.

Commenting on Simon's role in the Torricelli case, The Philadelphia Inquirer said, “He may not have knocked Robert G. Torricelli out of the New Jersey Senate race, but in a postmortem of the senator's dizzying fall, Bradley D. Simon may go down as having given a solid push.” The Inquirer continues: “Simon filed a memo in May with a federal court in Newark, New Jersey, asking for a reduction in Chang's sentence. The real villain, Simon wrote, is Torricelli. The memo details Chang's cash payments to Torricelli, lists the favors Torricelli allegedly gave in return, mentions corroborating witnesses, and accuses Torricelli of having "dodged, weaved and outright lied." Simon's memo led to the release four months later of a government document that helped sink the Torricelli campaign.”

=== James Marquez: 2007-2008 ===
Simon also represented James Marquez in the $450 million dollar collapse of the Bayou Hedge Fund Group, which is among the first criminal prosecutions of a hedge fund collapse to date.

=== Frank Borghese: 2004-2011 ===
Beginning in 2004, Simon represented Frank Borghese, the former vice president of Symbol Technologies Inc. (acquired by Motorola in 2007) in a case that resulted in a ruling that Borghese, along with one other co-defendant, were barred from a re-trial because of double jeopardy. The New York Law Journal cited this decision as "unprecedented” from the U.S. Court of Appeals for the Second Circuit.

== Other work ==
Simon is frequently called upon by The New York Times, The Wall Street Journal, CNN and other media outlets to offer commentary on legal issues involving white collar crime. Simon has been interviewed extensively regarding the government's insider trading cases. Simon has sharply criticized the government for focusing on mid-level and lower lever traders while failing to prosecute titans such as SAC Capital hedge fund's founder, Steven Cohen. In March 2013 the New Yorker Magazine published a controversial expose by investigative reporter John Cassidy, entitled: “Is Steven Cohen Buying Off the U.S. Government.” Cassidy interviewed Simon in support of his contention that the government lacked the will and fortitude to charge Cohen while not hesitating to indict his underlings., “ I read the Martoma complaint,” Bradley Simon, a prominent white collar defense attorney and former federal prosecutor, told me. “ It seems like there’s evidence for them to charge Cohen, but they don’t want to do it.”

A controversial New York Daily News column by Simon appeared on the eve of the 2016 presidential election entitled, “Bureau Boss is a Good Guy in a Tight Situation.” Simon defended the actions of FBI Director James Comey in reopening the Hillary Clinton email investigation, arguing that Comey was left with no choice.

Simon has been quoted in the New York Times and other publications in connection with the indictments arising out of the college admissions corruption scandal.
