= Greg Leding =

American politician (born 1978)

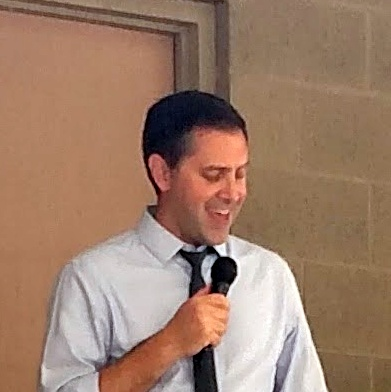

Minority Leader of the Arkansas Senate
- Incumbent
- Assumed office January 9, 2023
- Preceded by: Keith Ingram

Member of the Arkansas Senate
- Incumbent
- Assumed office January 14, 2019
- Preceded by: Uvalde Lindsey
- Constituency: 5th district (2019‍–‍2023); 30th district (since 2023)

Minority Leader of the Arkansas House of Representatives
- In office January 15, 2013 – January 12, 2015
- Preceded by: John Burris
- Succeeded by: Eddie Armstrong

Member of the Arkansas House of Representatives
- In office January 10, 2011 – January 14, 2019
- Preceded by: Lindsley Smith
- Succeeded by: Nicole Clowney
- Constituency: 92nd district (2011‍–‍2013); 86th district (2013‍–‍2019)

Personal details
- Born: April 10, 1978 (age 48) Springdale, Arkansas, U.S.
- Party: Democratic
- Spouse: Emily Ironside (m. 2013)
- Children: 1
- Education: University of Arkansas (BS)
- Website: Official website

Greg Leding (born April 10, 1978) is a Democratic politician who has represented the Fayetteville area in the Arkansas General Assembly since 2011. He served as minority leader in the Arkansas House of Representatives from 2012 to 2014 and currently serves as minority leader in the Arkansas Senate.

A lifelong resident of Arkansas, Leding graduated from Springdale High School and holds a bachelor's degree from the Sam M. Walton College of Business at the University of Arkansas.

== Arkansas General Assembly ==
The 91st General Assembly convened on Monday, January 9, 2017. Leding filed a number of bills, including:

- HB1014 (now Act 666), the Teacher's Classroom Investment Deduction, to allow Arkansas teachers to claim up to a $250 deduction on their state taxes for out-of-pocket expenses for their classrooms
- HB1009, part of a package of ethics bills sponsored by Arkansas Democrats. The bill would prevent a member of the General Assembly from forming more than one approved political action committee (PAC)
- HB1395, a bill to provide a tax credit to small businesses that hire veterans
- HB1509 (now Act 1013), the Sudden Cardiac Arrest Prevention Act, a measure to protect student athletes
- HB1592 (now Act 543), a bill to ensure insurance coverage parity for oral chemotherapeutics
- HB1624, the Right to Wages Earned Act, a bill to protect from workers from wage theft
- HB1625, the Right to Know Your Pay Act, a bill to protect both workers and employers during wage theft disputes
- HB1758 (now Act 962), a bill to help protect firefighters from cancer
- HB1797, a bill to add sexual orientation and gender identity to the Arkansas Civil Rights Act of 1993
- HB1850, the Strong Families Act, a bill to provide a tax credit to employers that voluntarily offer a paid family leave policy
- HB2000 (now Act 1028), a bill to protect job applicants from erroneous information found during background checks
- HB2022 (now Act 708), a bill regarding insurance coverage for breast ultrasounds and digital tomosynthesis
- HB2088, a bill to provide enhanced penalties for hate crimes
- HB2124, a bill to eliminate the asset test for long-term care Medicaid within the Arkansas Medicaid program for veterans
- HCR1003, a House Concurrent Resolution to designate Arkansaurus fridayi as the official state dinosaur of Arkansas

=== Committee assignments ===
Co-Chair

- Higher Education Subcommittee of Arkansas Legislative Council

Member

- Arkansas Legislative Council (ALC)
- House Committee on Revenue and Taxation
- House Income Taxes - Personal and Corporate Subcommittee
- House Committee on Aging, Children and Youth, Legislative, and Military Affairs
- House Aging Subcommittee

=== Legislative work ===
During his first term, Leding passed The Jason Flatt Act, a measure to reduce youth suicide in Arkansas. In his second term, during which he served as the House Minority Leader, Leding worked with Republicans and Democrats to pass a bipartisan package of bills to prevent human trafficking in Arkansas. Other bipartisan legislative achievements in 2013 include The Landowner Notification Act, a measure to protect landowners living in the Fayetteville Shale, co-sponsored by Senator Jason Rapert (R-Conway), as well as bipartisan legislation to better protect the Buffalo National River, co-sponsored by Representative Kelley Linck (R-Flippin). In 2015, bills passed by Leding included the Student Online Personal Information and Protection Act and a bipartisan bill to help the families of firefighters who die of job-related cancers. Other legislative efforts have included a 2015 bipartisan measure to end juvenile life without parole, co-sponsored by Senator Missy Irvin (R-Mountain View); efforts in 2015 to address privacy issues, establish the Arkansas New Jobs Training Program, and add the words "sexual orientation, gender identity" to the Arkansas Civil Rights Act of 1993; efforts in 2013, 2015, 2017 to establish paid family leave and to address Arkansas's landlord-tenant laws (including its lack of any warranty of habitability and its criminal eviction statutes); and efforts in 2011, 2013, 2015, and 2017 to address wage theft. Leding is also working with Arkansas veterans to secure hyperbaric oxygen therapy as means of treatment for veterans suffering from traumatic brain injury.

In August 2015, Leding launched two interim studies, one concerned with student debt in Arkansas and one examining sexual assault on the state's college and university campuses. Final reports for each are due in July 2017.

=== Caucuses ===
Leding is a member of the Arkansas Legislative Hunger Caucus, the Arkansas Veterans Caucus, the Arkansas Education Caucus, the Arkansas Sportsmen's Caucus, and the Arkansas Aerospace Caucus.

== National Conference of State Legislatures ==
From August 2012 until August 2014, Leding served as a vice chair of the Natural Resources and Infrastructure Committee of the National Conference of State Legislatures (NCSL). He was elected to the NCSL Executive Committee in August 2014. In May 2015, he was named to the NCSL Legislative Task Force on Military and Veterans Affairs. In May 2016, he was named to the NCSL Task Force on International Relations. In January 2017, Leding was named to the NCSL Foundation Board.

== National Institute for Civil Discourse ==
In 2015, Leding became involved with the National Institute for Civil Discourse, a nonpartisan center for advocacy, research, and policy, and its Next Generation program for state legislators.

== Elections ==
=== State House ===
Leding first ran for the Arkansas House of Representatives in 2010, defeating J. W. "Bill" Ramsey in the Democratic Primary by a margin of 61 percent to 39 percent. He won re-election in 2012, defeating Republican Brian Scott by a margin of 61 percent to 39 percent. Leding ran unopposed in 2014 and 2016.

=== State Senate ===
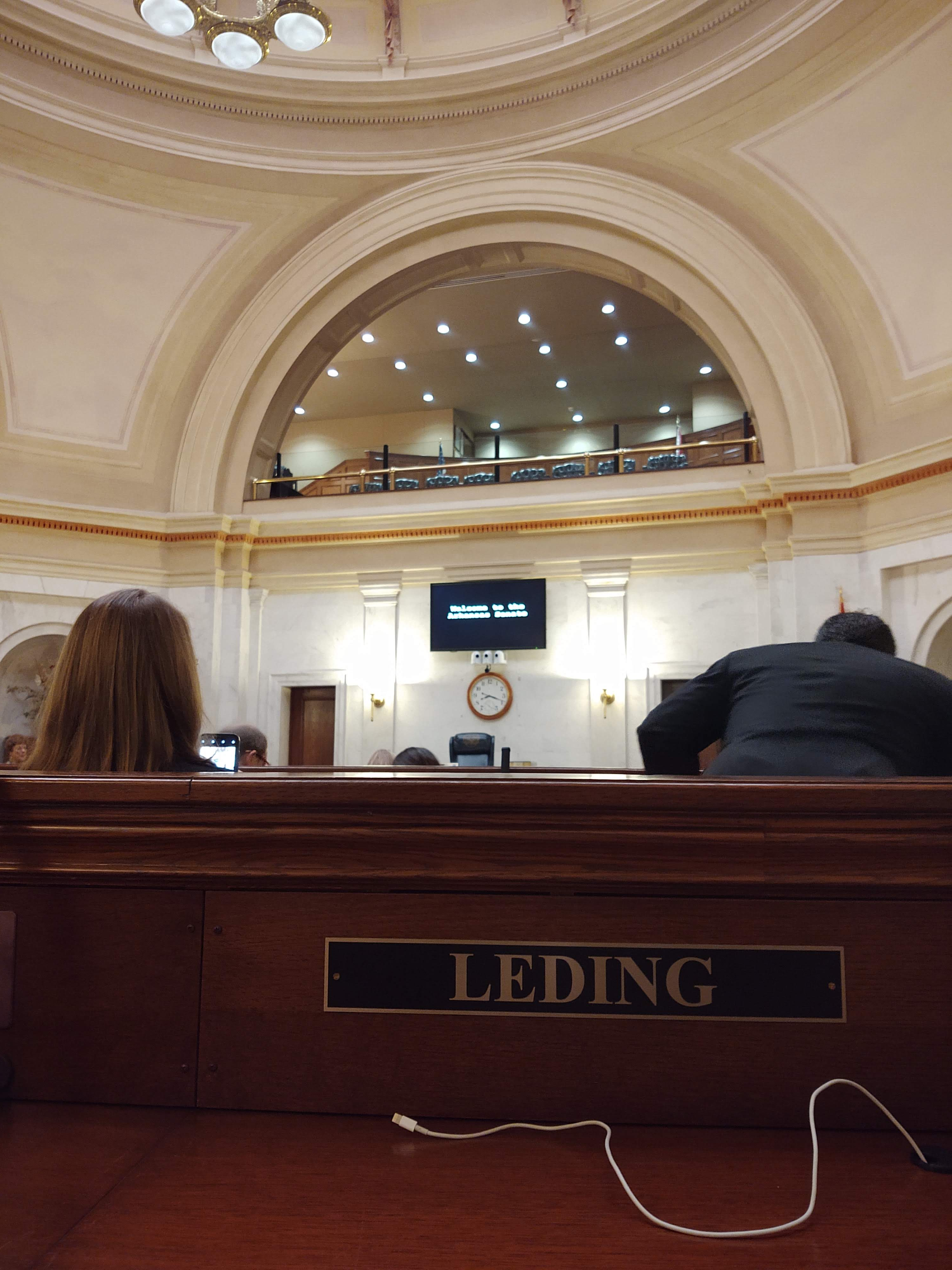
Senator Leding's seat in the Senate Chamber

On Tuesday, June 13, 2017, Leding announced his candidacy for Arkansas Senate District 4. The incumbent, Senator Uvalde Lindsey (D-Fayetteville), had previously announced his retirement. The election was Tuesday, November 6, 2018, and Leding was the winner.

== Awards and recognition ==
Among the awards Leding has received during his time in office are the Citizens First Congress "Champion Legislator" award (2011), the Arkansas Support Network "Community Distinction Award" (2011), the Arkansas Kids Count Coalition "Rising Star" award (2011), the Northwest Arkansas Workers' Justice Center "Prophetic Leader" award (2013), the National Association of Social Workers (Arkansas Chapter) "Elected Public Official of the Year" award (2013), the Northwest Arkansas Tobacco-Free Coalition "Smoke-Free Advocate of the Year" award (2013), the Arkansas Advanced Energy Association "Champion of Advanced Energy" award (2013), the Public Policy Panel "Champion Legislator" award (2013), the Arkansas Municipal League "Distinguished Legislator" award (2013), the AARP "Distinguished Legislator" award (2013), the first Washington County Democrats "John Logan Burrow Democratic Leadership" award (2014), the Kids Count "Legislative Leadership Award for Juvenile Justice" (2015), the Kids Count "Legislative Leadership Award for Family Economic Security" (2015), the Arkansas State Firefighters Association "Legislative Chair Award" (2015), the Arkansas State Employees Association "Outstanding Legislator" award (2015), the Community Clinic of Northwest Arkansas "Community Health Center Champion" award (2015), the Arkansans for Gifted and Talented Education (AGATE) "Presidential Award" (2016), and the Graduate Student Congress of the University of Arkansas "Civic Ally of the Year" award (2016).

In January 2013, Talk Business Arkansas listed Leding among the "Top 10 Legislators to Watch". In May 2013, Talk Business Arkansas listed Leding among the "Talk Business Arkansas' Top 10 State Legislators".

In January 2017, Leding was again named to Talk Business Arkansas' list of legislators to watch for the 2017 regular session.

== Boards ==
Leding joined the Hope Cancer Resources Foundation Board of Directors in February 2015 and the Fayetteville Adult Education Center Advisory Board in June 2016.

== Personal life ==
The oldest of three children, Leding and his wife, Emily Ironside, have one daughter. They live in Fayetteville.

Arkansas House of Representatives
Preceded by John Burris	Minority Leader of the Arkansas House of Representatives; 2013–2015	Succeeded by Eddie Armstrong
Arkansas Senate
Preceded by Keith Ingram	Minority Leader of the Arkansas Senate; 2023–present	Incumbent
