= Brandon Achor =

American politician (born 1989)

Member of the Arkansas House of Representatives from the 71st district
- Incumbent
- Assumed office 2023
- Preceded by: Joe Cloud

Personal details
- Born: April 4, 1989 (age 37)
- Party: Republican
- Spouse: Kaley
- Children: 1
- Education: University of Arkansas; University of Arkansas for Medical Sciences
- Occupation: Pharmacist

Brandon Achor (born 1989) is an American politician. He serves as a Republican member for the 71st district of the Arkansas House of Representatives.

== Background ==
Achor lived in Maumelle, Arkansas. He attended the University of Arkansas and the University of Arkansas for Medical Sciences, where he earned his Doctor of Pharmacy degree in 2015. He and his wife Kaley co-own several independent pharmacies.

== Political career ==
In April 2022, Achor was a candidate for the 71st district of the Arkansas House of Representatives. He defeated his opponent Wes Booker in the Republican primary election. In November 2022, Achor defeated John Pack and Aaron Robert Raatz in the general election, winning 57 percent of the votes. He succeeded Joe Cloud. He assumed office in 2023.

As of the 95th General Assembly, he serves on the House Revenue and Taxation Committee and the Insurance and Commerce Committee.
