= Ben Gilmore =

American politician

Member of the Arkansas Senate from the 1st district
- In office January 11, 2021 – June 30, 2026
- Preceded by: Eddie Cheatham
- Succeeded by: Vacant

Personal details
- Born: Lewis Ben Gilmore
- Party: Republican

Ben Gilmore is an American politician who served as a member of the Arkansas Senate for the 1st district. Elected in November 2020, he assumed office on January 11, 2021.

== Early life and education ==
A native of Crossett, Arkansas, Gilmore attended Liberty University and the University of Arkansas at Monticello.

== Career ==
Gilmore served as a field representative for Congressman Bruce Westerman and as deputy chief of staff and communications director for Lieutenant Governor Tim Griffin. Gilmore was elected to the Arkansas Senate in November 2020 and assumed office on January 11, 2021.

Gilmore resigned from the Arkansas Senate in June 2026 after being appointed to a position in the office of Arkansas Attorney General Tim Griffin.
