= Alan Clark (Arkansas politician) =

American politician

Member of the Arkansas Senate from the 13th district
- Incumbent
- Assumed office January 14, 2013
- Preceded by: Mike Fletcher

Personal details
- Party: Republican
- Spouse: Jana Clark
- Children: 2

Alan Clark is an American politician. He served as a Republican member for the 13th district of the Arkansas Senate.

In 2013, Clark won the election for the 13th district of the Arkansas Senate. He succeeded Mike Fletcher. Clark assumed his office on January 14, 2013.

On June 27, 2022, Clark was stripped of his committee chairmanships and reprimanded by the Arkansas Senate Ethics Committee for fraudulently claiming per diem and travel reimbursements for meetings he did not attend.
