= Blake Johnson (Arkansas politician) =

American politician

Majority Leader of Arkansas Senate
- Incumbent
- Assumed office January 9, 2023
- Preceded by: Scott Flippo

Member of the Arkansas Senate from the 21st district
- Incumbent
- Assumed office January 12, 2015
- Preceded by: Robert F. Thompson

Personal details
- Born: Poplar Bluff, Missouri, U.S.
- Party: Republican
- Education: Arkansas State University (BS)

Blake Johnson is an American farmer and politician serving in the Arkansas Senate from the 20th district. He won the seat after defeating Democratic incumbent Robert F. Thompson 53.8% to 46.2%, flipping the district from Democratic to Republican. He and fellow state senator Dan Sullivan swapped districts before the 2022 elections, and Johnson ran for third term in the 21st district. Before serving in the Senate, he served as an Alderman for the city of Corning. On March 3, 2026, he would lose the Republican primary to two-term Rep. Jeremy Wooldridge.

Arkansas Senate
Preceded by Bart Hester	Majority Leader of the Arkansas Senate; 2023–present	Incumbent
