= Ron Caldwell =

American politician

Member of the Arkansas Senate from the 10th district (Previously 23rd District)
- Incumbent
- Assumed office January 1, 2013

Personal details
- Born: Wynne, Arkansas
- Party: Republican

Ronald Caldwell is an American politician and businessman. A Republican, he has served three terms in the Arkansas Senate, currently representing District 10, and previously District 23. He was first elected in 2012, and won his third and current term in 2020. Caldwell is the chairman of the Senate Committee on State Agencies and Governmental Affairs, and is a member of several other committees.

Caldwell was born in Wynne, Arkansas, in Cross County. He is an alumnus of Arkansas State University, where he graduated with a bachelor's degree in marketing. In December 2018, he broke his hip riding a horse.
