= Scott Flippo =

American politician

Majority Leader of Arkansas Senate
- In office January 11, 2021 – January 9, 2023
- Preceded by: Bart Hester
- Succeeded by: Blake Johnson

Member of the Arkansas Senate from the 17th district
- Incumbent
- Assumed office January 12, 2015
- Preceded by: Johnny Key

Personal details
- Born: Mountain Home, Arkansas, U.S.
- Party: Republican
- Education: University of Arkansas, Fayetteville (BA)

Scott Flippo is a state senator in Arkansas. A Republican, in 2021 he is majority leader in the Arkansas Senate. He has been in the state senate since 2015. He was born in Mountain Home, Arkansas, and graduated from Mountain Home High School. He now lives in Bull Shoals. He has a degree in Business Administration from the University of Arkansas and owns the Carefree Living assisted living center. He is a Methodist.

Arkansas Senate
Preceded by Bart Hester	Majority Leader of the Arkansas Senate; 2021–2023	Succeeded by Blake Johnson
