= Trent Garner =

Arkansas senator

Member of the Arkansas Senate from the 27th district
- In office 2017–2023
- Preceded by: Bobby Pierce

Personal details
- Party: Republican
- Spouse: Kelly Garner
- Children: 2
- Parent: Linda O'Dell Garner
- Education: University of Arkansas at Little Rock (BA); University of Arkansas (MA, JD)

Military service
- Branch/service: United States Army
- Unit: United States Army Special Forces 20th Special Forces Group

Trent Garner is an American attorney and politician serving as a Republican member of the Arkansas Senate from the 27th district. Elected in November 2016, he assumed office on 2017.

== Early life and education ==
Garner is a native of Harmony Grove, Arkansas. He earned a Bachelor of Arts degree in political science and government from the University of Arkansas at Little Rock, followed by a Master of Arts and Juris Doctor from the University of Arkansas School of Law.

== Career ==
Garner served in the United States Army Special Forces, completing two tours during the War in Afghanistan. He was elected to the Arkansas Senate in November 2016 and assumed office in 2017. Garner also serves as vice chair of the Senate State Agencies and Governmental Affairs Committee since 2019. On May 2, 2022, Garner announced that he had re-enlisted in the US Army to serve as a Green Beret with the 20th Special Forces Group upon the completion of his term with the Arkansas Senate.
