= Breanne Davis =

American politician

Member of the Arkansas Senate from the 16 district
- Incumbent
- Assumed office June 19, 2018
- Preceded by: Greg Standridge

Personal details
- Party: Republican
- Education: Arkansas Tech University (BA)

Breanne Davis is an American politician serving as a member of the Arkansas Senate from the 16th district. Elected in a special election, she assumed office on June 19, 2018.

== Early life and education ==
Davis graduated from Russellville High School and earned a Bachelor of Arts degree in speech communication from Arkansas Tech University.

== Career ==
As a college student, Davis worked as an intern in the office of then-Congressman John Boozman. After earning her bachelor's degree, she worked as an office manager for a lobbying firm. She later worked as the office manager for Blackstone Construction. In 2014 and 2015, Davis was a self-employed lobbyist. From 2015 to 2018, she was an account executive at the SAS Institute. She also served as board president, communications liaison, and secretary for the Russellville Board of Education. She was elected to the Arkansas Senate in a 2018 special election.
