= Clarke Tucker =

American politician

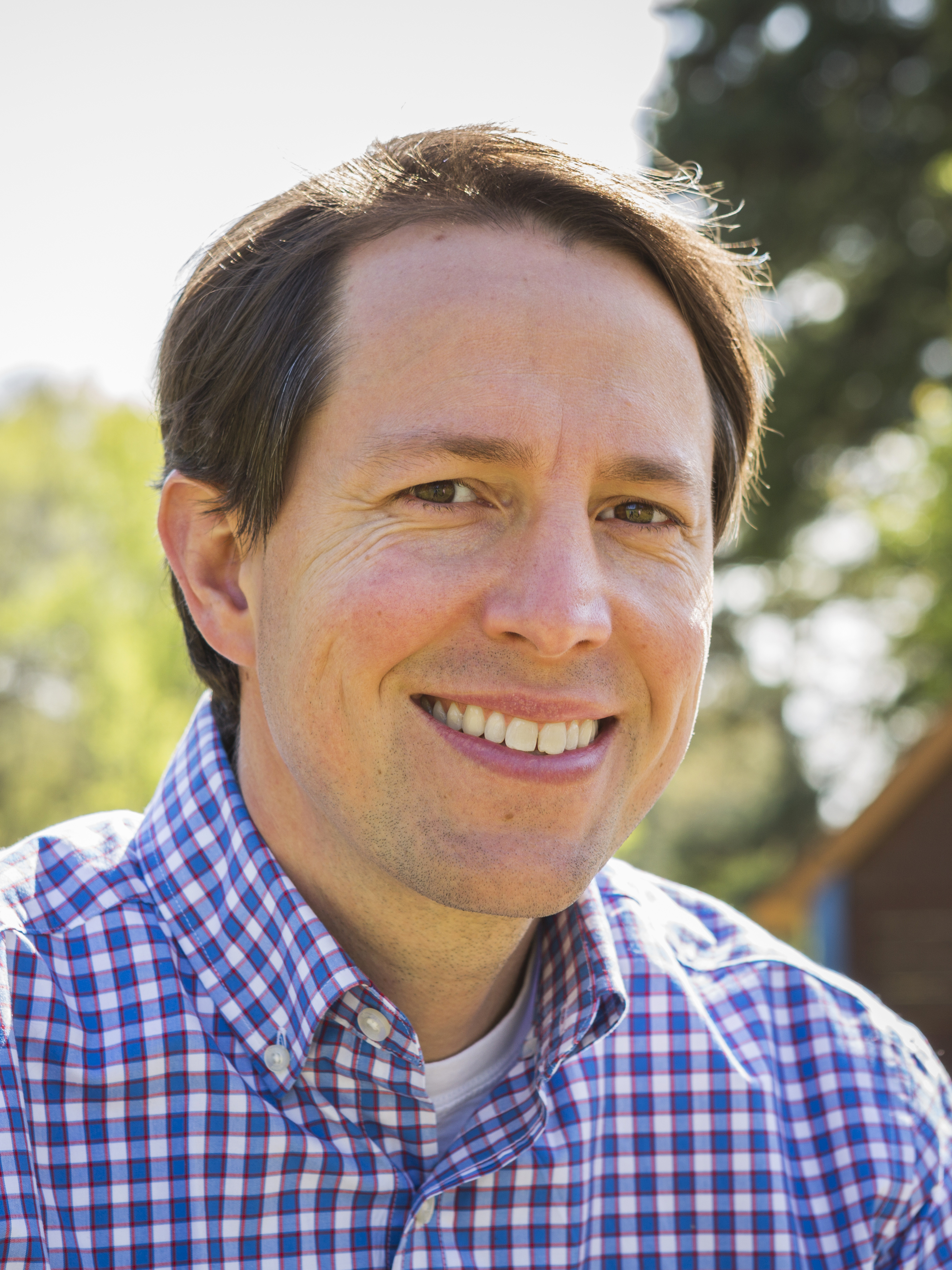

Member of the Arkansas Senate
- Incumbent
- Assumed office January 11, 2021
- Preceded by: Will Bond
- Constituency: 32nd district (2021–2023); 14th district (2023–present)

Member of the Arkansas House of Representatives from the 35th district
- In office January 2015 – January 2019
- Preceded by: John Charles Edwards
- Succeeded by: Andrew Collins

Personal details
- Born: Everett Clarke Tucker IV; January 20, 1981 (age 45) Little Rock, Arkansas, U.S.
- Party: Democratic
- Spouse: Toni Leigh Register
- Children: 2
- Education: Harvard University (BA); University of Arkansas (JD)

Everett Clarke Tucker IV (born January 20, 1981) is an American attorney and Democratic politician from Central Arkansas. He served in the Arkansas House of Representatives from 2015 to 2019, and currently serves in the Arkansas Senate since January 2021. In 2018, he unsuccessfully challenged incumbent French Hill to represent Arkansas's 2nd congressional district in the United States House of Representatives.

== Early life and education ==
Tucker was born in Little Rock, Arkansas, and attended Little Rock Central High School, where he played baseball and was elected student body president. He earned a Bachelor of Arts in government from Harvard University in 2003, followed by a J.D. degree from the University of Arkansas School of Law in 2006, where he was the editor-in-chief of the Arkansas Law Review.

After law school, Tucker served for two years as a clerk for Judge James Leon Holmes in the United States District Court for the Eastern District of Arkansas. He entered private practice at Quattlebaum, Grooms & Tull in Little Rock, specializing in commercial litigation, while also teaching at the William H. Bowen School of Law as an adjunct professor. Tucker was chairman of the board for the Pulaski County Imagination Library, a free book-gifting program for children from birth to age five.

== Arkansas House of Representatives ==
First elected to the Arkansas House of Representatives in 2014, Tucker represented the 35th District, which includes part of Little Rock and greater Pulaski County, until 2019.

== 2018 U.S. House campaign ==
Tucker announced his candidacy for the U.S. House in Arkansas's 2nd congressional district on February 5, 2018. A cancer survivor, Tucker said that "healthcare is really the issue that pushed me into the race." He secured the Democratic nomination on May 22, 2018, receiving 58% of the vote against three opponents in the primary election.

Tucker raised over $500,000 in the first fundraising quarter of 2018. He was included on the New Democrats PAC watch list. The PAC's watch list supports candidates with a $1,000 campaign contribution, but it does not function as a full PAC endorsement. The New Democrats PAC is the political arm of the New Democrat Coalition. Tucker's sources of funds led with large individual contributions, followed by small individual contributions, and lastly, political action committee (PAC) contributions. In the summer of 2018, Tucker's campaign was added to the Democratic Congressional Campaign Committee's (DCCC) Red to Blue program. The Red to Blue program, sponsored by the campaign arm of the congressional Democrats, targeted Republican-held seats in districts won by Donald Trump in 2016 that could be considered competitive or ultimately flipped. To qualify for DCCC support, a candidate's campaign must demonstrate the capacity to surpass fundraising goals, grassroots engagement, local support, and campaign organization.

== Personal life ==
Tucker and his wife, Toni, live in Little Rock with their two children. Tucker was diagnosed with bladder cancer in 2017. It was successfully treated via chemotherapy and surgery, and in late 2017 Tucker announced that he was cancer-free.
