= Missy Irvin =

American politician

Member of the Arkansas Senate from the 24th district (Previously 10th & 18th districts)
- Incumbent
- Assumed office 2011

Personal details
- Born: February 12, 1971 (age 55)
- Party: Republican

Missy Thomas Irvin (born February 12, 1971) is a Republican member of the Arkansas Senate, where she has served since 2011.

Irvin is a member of the Senate Ethics Committee. In 2019, Irvin and the committee censured Stephanie Flowers for calling fellow legislator Trent Garner a "dumbass" during a debate. In 2020, the committee rejected an ethics complaint against Kim Hendren over wage issues at his business.

Irvin and Jay Richardson introduced a bill to allow cyclists to yield (rather than stop) at red lights and stop signs. It passed the legislature and was signed into law by Governor Asa Hutchinson.
