= Ricky Hill (politician) =

American politician

Member of the Arkansas Senate
- Incumbent
- Assumed office June 19, 2018
- Preceded by: Eddie Joe Williams
- Constituency: 29th (2018–2023); 11th (2023–present)

Personal details
- Party: Republican
- Spouse: Cynthia
- Children: 2
- Education: Arkansas State University (MS)

Ricky Hill is an American politician and banker serving as a member of the Arkansas Senate from the 11th district. He assumed office on June 19, 2018.

== Early life and education ==
A native of Lonoke County, Arkansas, Hill graduated from Cabot High School. He earned a Master of Science degree in agriculture business and economics from Arkansas State University.

== Career ==
From 2002 to 2012, Hill was the vice president of First Security Bank. He has since worked as executive vice president of Bank OZK. Hill was elected to the Arkansas Senate in a June 2018 special election after Eddie Joe Williams resigned to take a position in the Trump administration. Since 2018, Hill has served as vice chair of the Senate Agriculture, Forestry and Economic Development Committee.
