= Jane English (politician) =

American politician (born 1940)

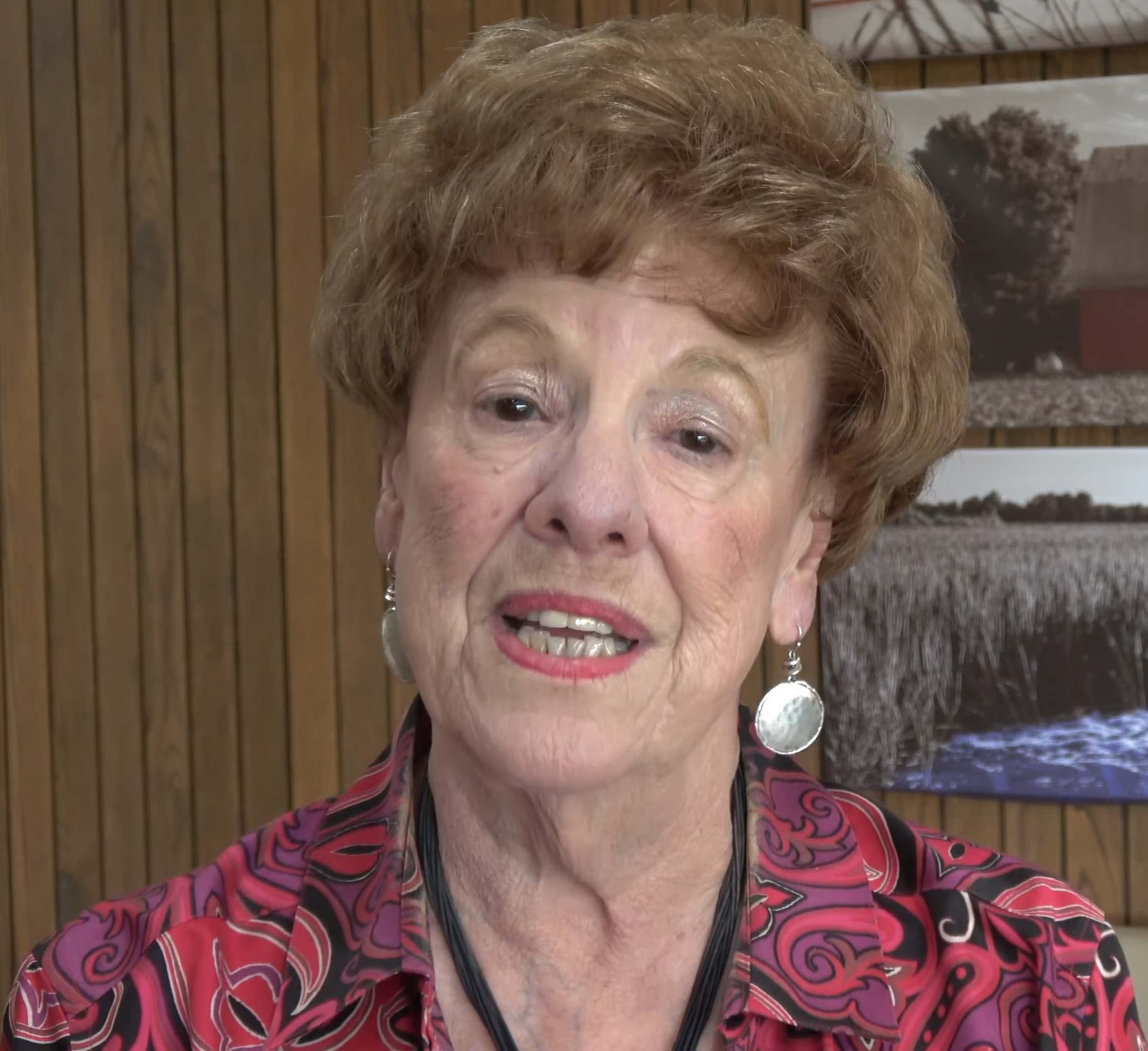
- English in 2021

Member of the Arkansas Senate from the 13th district (Previously 30th District)
- Incumbent
- Assumed office January 14, 2013

Member of the Arkansas House of Representatives from the 42nd district
- In office 2009–2012

Personal details
- Born: Lincoln, Nebraska
- Party: Republican
- Education: Arkansas Tech University

Jane English (born 1940) is a Republican state senator in Arkansas, United States. She represents District 13 in the Arkansas Senate. She served in the Arkansas House of Representatives from 2009 into 2012. She became a member of the state senate in 2013. She lives in North Little Rock and represents part of Pulaski County. She is Protestant.

She was born in Lincoln, Nebraska and graduated from Arkansas Tech University. She previously worked for the Arkansas Economic Development Commission and served on a variety of boards and commissions prior to running for office.
