= Arkansas Senate =

Upper house of the Arkansas General Assembly

Coordinates: 34°44′48″N 92°17′21″W

- 95th Arkansas General Assembly
- State seal

Type
- Type: Upper house
- Term limits: Members first elected on or before November 3, 2020: 16 years (consecutive or non-consecutive, both houses), eligible to run again 4 years after their last term ends. Members first elected after November 3, 2020: 12 years (consecutive, both houses), eligible to run again 4 years after their last term ends.

History
- Founded: January 30, 1836
- Preceded by: Arkansas Council (Territorial)
- New session started: January 13, 2025

Leadership
- President: Leslie Rutledge (R) since January 10, 2023
- President pro tempore: Bart Hester (R) since January 9, 2023
- Majority Leader: Blake Johnson (R) since January 9, 2023
- Minority Leader: Greg Leding (D) since January 9, 2023

Structure
- Seats: 35
- Political groups: Majority: Republican (29); Minority: Democratic (6)
- Length of term: 4 years normally. Possibility of 2 years in years ending in 2.
- Authority: Article 8, Section 2, Arkansas Constitution
- Salary: $39,399.84/year + per diem

Elections
- Voting system: First-past-the-post
- Last election: November 5, 2024 (17 seats)
- Next election: November 3, 2026 (18 seats)
- Redistricting: Arkansas Board of Apportionment

Meeting place
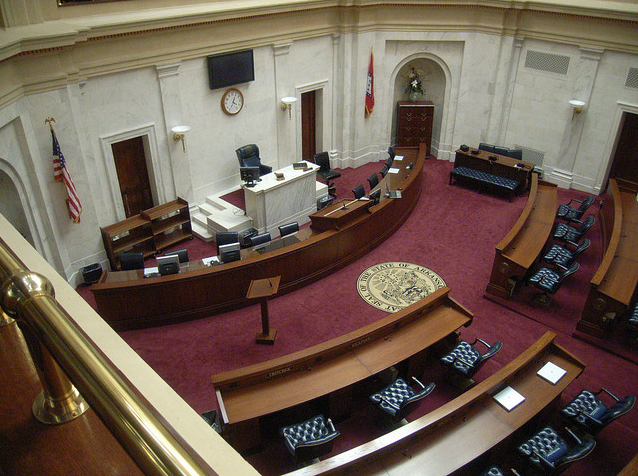
- Senate Chamber; Arkansas State Capitol; Little Rock, Arkansas

Website
- Arkansas Senate

The Arkansas State Senate is the upper branch of the Arkansas General Assembly. The Senate consists of 35 members, each representing a district with about 83,000 people. Service in the state legislature is part-time, and many state senators have full-time jobs during the rest of the year. During the current term, the Senate contains twenty-eight Republicans, six Democrats and one vacancy.

== History ==
The Arkansas Senate was created and re-created by the Arkansas Constitution ratified on January 30, 1836. It is now governed by the fifth and current constitution of Arkansas adopted in 1874.

During the Reconstruction era after the American Civil War, the federal government passed the Reconstruction Acts and enfranchised African Americans. Many African Americans served in the Arkansas House and a smaller number in the Arkansas Senate (African American officeholders from the end of the Civil War until before 1900) until Democrats reasserted white supremacy and barred them from voting and holding office as was done across the American south.

In 1947, the Arkansas Legislative Council committee was created to collect data for legislators and oversee the Bureau of Legislative Research, which is composed of professional, nonpartisan staff to aid in the legislative process. The committee consists of 36 legislators, 16 of which are state senators.

In 1964, Dorathy M. Allen became the first woman elected to the Arkansas Senate. During her time in office, she was the only woman in the Arkansas Senate.

Legislators met biennially until a 2008 ballot initiative created annual legislative sessions. In 1992, voters approved term limits of two four-year terms. In 2014, term limits were extended to 16 years cumulative in either house. In 2020, voters approved a constitutional amendment changing terms limits to 12 consecutive years with the opportunity to return after a 4-year break. This change only affects legislators elected after the November 2020 elections. Legislators elected in the November 2020 elections or earlier can serve 16 years consecutively or non-consecutively and return once 4 years have passed from their last term expiring.

== Powers and process ==
Arkansas state senators are responsible for making and amending the laws of Arkansas in collaboration with the Arkansas House of Representatives and the governor. Senators begin the legislative process by submitting bill requests to the staff of the Bureau of Legislative Research that drafts a bill to conform to the author's intent. Bills are then filed with the Secretary of the Arkansas Senate or an assistant secretary of the Arkansas Senate. The legislative process during the legislative session mirrors that of other state legislatures in the United States. Bills are introduced on First Reading and assigned to a committee, vetted by the committee, undergo Second and Third Readings on the floor of the Senate, go to the opposite house of the legislature, and return or go directly to the governor. The governor has veto power, but two-thirds of the membership of both houses of the legislature can override that veto.

State senators are also responsible for approving the governor's appointments and 16 members of the Arkansas Senate serve on the Arkansas Legislative Council and the Joint Auditing Committee. The Arkansas Legislative Council oversees the Bureau of Legislative Research, which provides professional support services for legislators. It also acts as an organizing committee and members of the council exert a greater degree of influence over the legislative process and outcome.

== Terms and qualifications ==
The senators are usually elected for four-year terms. After the U.S. Census every ten years, all Senate districts are redrawn to ensure that they each have approximately the same number of constituents. After redistricting, every senate position appears on the ballot in the next election. Following this, senators draw lots, and 18 are allotted a two-year term while 17 receive a four-year term. This staggers elections so that only half the body is up for re-election every two years.

Two-year terms drawn by a senator after reapportionment do not count against a senator's service under the term limits amendment, which limits Arkansas state senators to two terms of four years. A senator who draws a two-year term can serve for 10 or even 12 years, depending on when they were elected.

Arkansas Constitution – Article 5. Legislative Department. § 3. Senate.

The Senate shall consist of members to be chosen every four years, by the qualified electors of the several districts. At the first session of the Senate, the Senators shall divide themselves into two classes, by lot, and the first class shall hold their places for two years only, after which all shall be elected for four years.

They are also limited to serving no more than two four-year terms.

Arkansas Constitution – Amendment 73. Arkansas Term Limitation Amendment. § 2(b). Legislative Branch.

The Arkansas Senate shall consist of members to be chosen every four years by the qualified electors of the several districts. No member of the Arkansas Senate may serve more than two such four-year terms.

== Current composition ==
6	29
Democratic	Republican

Affiliation	Party (Shading indicates majority caucus)			Total	Vacant
Affiliation	Democratic	Republican	Independent	Total	Vacant
End of 88th General Assembly (2012)	20	15	0	35	0
Begin 89th General Assembly (2013)	14	21	0	35	0
End of 89th General Assembly (2014)	13	22	0	35	0
90th General Assembly (2015)	11	24	0	35	0
Begin 91st General Assembly (2017)	9	26	0	35	0
November 15, 2017	9	25	0	34	1
November 16, 2017	9	24	0	33	2
February 9, 2018	9	23	0	32	3
June 19, 2018	9	25	0	34	1
93rd General Assembly (2021–2022)	7	27	1	35	0
94th General Assembly (2023–2024)	6	29	0	35	0
Begin 95th General Assembly (2025)	6	29	0	35	0
Latest voting share	17%	83%	0%		

== Organization ==
The president of the Senate is the presiding officer of the Arkansas Senate, but the president pro tempore is the presiding officer in the absence of the Senate president. In practice, the president pro tempore generally serves as the presiding officer. Other Senate leadership positions include majority leader, whip and minority party positions. Committee assignments are determined by seniority, according to the rules of the Senate.

=== Officers ===
Office	Officer	Party	District
President/Lieutenant Governor	Leslie Rutledge	Republican	N/A
President Pro Tempore of the Senate	Bart Hester	Republican	33
Assistant Pro Tempore, 1st District	Dave Wallace	Republican	19
Assistant Pro Tempore, 2nd District	Clarke Tucker	Democratic	14
Assistant Pro Tempore, 3rd District	Tyler Dees	Republican	35
Assistant Pro Tempore, 4th District	Matt Stone	Republican	2

=== Floor leaders ===
Office	Officer	Party	District
Majority Leader	Blake Johnson	Republican	21
Majority Whip	Breanne Davis	Republican	25
Minority Leader	Greg Leding	Democratic	30
Minority Whip	Fredrick Love	Democratic	15

== Committees ==
Current committees include:

- Agriculture, Forestry & Economic Development
  - Senate Small Business & Economic Development
  - Senate Forestry & Natural Resources
- Ar Legislative Council
- Children And Youth Committee
  - Senate Children & Youth Subcommittee
- City, County & Local Affairs Committee
- Education Committee
  - Public School Employee Health Insurance Subcommittee
  - Ar Comprehensive School Improvement Plans
- Insurance & Commerce
  - Senate Financial Institutions Subcommittee
- Judiciary Committee
  - Senate Health Services Subcom. (Synthetic Marijuana-K2)
  - Senate Court And Civil Law Subcommittee
  - Senate Correction, Criminal Law & Child Support Subcom.
- Public Health - Senate Subcommittee On Minority Health
- Public Health - Senate Substance Abuse Treatment Services Subcommittee
- Public Health, Welfare And Labor Committee
  - Senate Labor & Environment Subcommittee
  - Senate Human Services Subcommittee
  - Senate Health Services
- Revenue & Tax
  - Senate Subcommittee On Economic And Tax Policy
  - Senate Sales, Use, Misc. Taxes & Exepmtions Sub.
- Senate Biennial Institute
- Senate Efficiency
- Senate Rules, Resolutions & Memorials
  - Winthrop Rockefeller Memorial Subcommittee
- State Agencies & Governmental Affairs
  - Senate Election Laws Subcommittee
  - State Agencies & Governmental Affairs - Senate Constitutional Issues Subcommittee
- State Agencies & Governmental Affairs - Senate Sub. On Cosmetology Board Rules
- Transportation, Technology & Legislative Affairs
  - Senate Waterways & Aeronautics Subcommittee
  - Senate Motor Vehicle & Highways Subcommittee

== Current senators ==
District	Name	Party	Residence	Start	Next Election	Term Limited
1st	Vacant (Note: Republican Ben Gilmore resigned in order to take a position in the office of the state attorney general.)				2026 (special)	
2nd	Matt Stone	Rep	Camden	2022	2026	2034
3rd	Steve Crowell	Rep	Magnolia	2022	2028	2034
4th	Jimmy Hickey Jr.	Rep	Texarkana	2012	2028	2028
5th	Terry Rice	Rep	Waldron	2014	2028	2030
6th	Matt McKee	Rep	Pearcy	2022	2028	2034
7th	Alan Clark	Rep	Lonsdale	2012	2026	2028
8th	Stephanie Flowers	Dem	Pine Bluff	2010	2028	2026
9th	Reginald Murdock	Dem	Marianna	2010	2026	2026
10th	Ron Caldwell	Rep	Wynne	2012	2026	2028
11th	Ricky Hill	Rep	Cabot	2018 (special)	2026	2034
12th	Jamie Scott	Dem	North Little Rock	2024	2028	2034
13th	Jane English	Rep	North Little Rock	2012	2026	2028
14th	Clarke Tucker	Dem	Little Rock	2014	2026	2032
15th	Fredrick Love	Dem	Mabelvale	2010	2026	2026
16th	Kim Hammer	Rep	Benton	2018	2026	2034
17th	Mark Johnson	Rep	Little Rock	2018	2028	2034
18th	Vacant (Note: Republican Jonathan Dismang resigned in order to take a position outside of government.)				2028	
19th	David Wallace	Rep	Leachville	2016	2028	2032
20th	Dan Sullivan	Rep	Jonesboro	2014	2028	2030
21st	Blake Johnson	Rep	Corning	2014	2026	2030
22nd	John Payton	Rep	Wilburn	2012	2028	2028
23rd	Scott Flippo	Rep	Mountain Home	2014	2028	2030
24th	Missy Irvin	Rep	Mountain View	2010	2026	2026
25th	Breanne Davis	Rep	Russellville	2018 (special)	2028	2034
26th	Brad Simon	Rep	Paris	2026 (special)	2028	2038
27th	Justin Boyd	Rep	Fort Smith	2014	2026	2030
28th	Bryan King	Rep	Green Forest	2013	2026	2034
29th	Jim Petty	Rep	Van Buren	2022	2028	2034
30th	Greg Leding	Dem	Fayetteville	2018	2026	2034
31st	Clint Penzo	Rep	Springdale	2016	2026	2032
32nd	Joshua P. Bryant	Rep	Rogers	2020	2026	2036
33rd	Bart Hester	Rep	Cave Springs	2012	2028	2028
34th	Jim Dotson	Rep	Bentonville	2012	2028	2028
35th	Tyler Dees	Rep	Siloam Springs	2022	2026	2034

== See also ==
- List of presidents pro tempore of the Arkansas Senate
- Arkansas House of Representatives
- List of Arkansas General Assemblies
