= 90th Arkansas General Assembly =

Term of state legislature in Arkansas, US

←	89th	91st	→
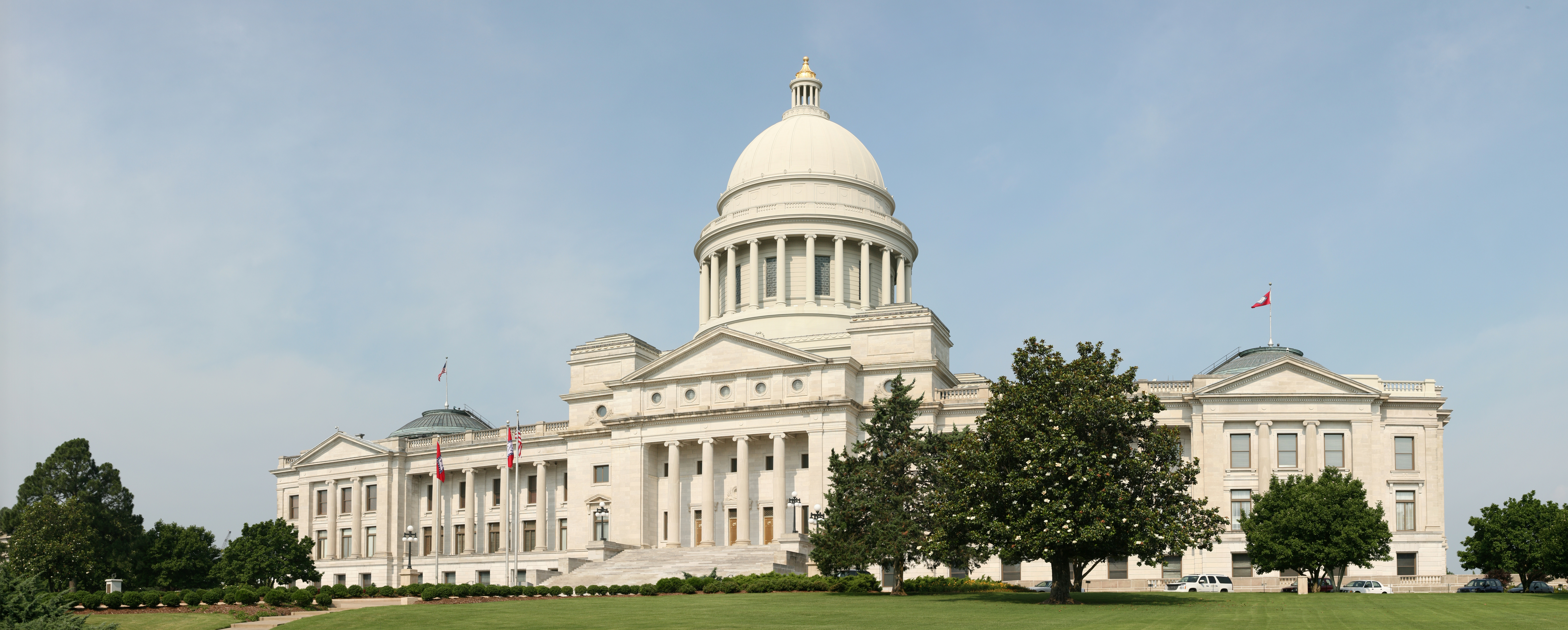
- Arkansas State Capitol (2009)

Overview
- Term: January 12, 2015 – April 2, 2015

Arkansas Senate
- Members: 34 (23 R, 11 D, 1 vacant)
- President of the Senate: Tim Griffin (R)
- President Pro Tempore of the Senate: Jonathan Dismang (R)
- Majority Leader: Jim Hendren
- Minority Leader: Keith Ingram
- Party control: Republican Party

House of Representatives
- House party standings
- Members: 100 (69 R, 30 D, 1 Independent)
- House Speaker: Jeremy Gillam (R)
- Speaker pro Tempore: Jon Eubanks (R)
- Majority Leader: Ken Bragg (R)
- Minority Leader: David Whitaker (D)
- Party control: Republican Party

Sessions
- 1st: January 12, 2015 – April 2, 2015
- 2nd: May 26, 2015 – May 29, 2015

The Ninetieth Arkansas General Assembly was the legislative body of the state of Arkansas in 2015 and 2016. In this General Assembly, the Arkansas Senate and Arkansas House of Representatives were both controlled by the Republicans. In the Senate, 23 senators were Republicans, 11 were Democrats, and one position was vacant until April. In the House, 69 representatives were Republicans, 30 were Democrats, and one was independent.

== Sessions ==
The 90th General Assembly opened session on January 12, 2015. A special session was called on May 26, 2015 to move Arkansas's primary date to the SEC Primary.

== Major events ==
=== Vacancies ===
- Senator Greg Standridge (R-16th) won a special election in February 2015, but was not seated until April 2015

== Senate ==
=== Leadership ===
==== Officers ====
Office	Officer	Party	District
President/Lieutenant Governor	Tim Griffin	Republican	
President Pro Tempore of the Senate	Jonathan Dismang	Republican	16
Assistant Presidents pro tempore	Eddie Joe Williams	Republican	18
Assistant Presidents pro tempore	Jane English	Republican	34
Assistant Presidents pro tempore	Cecile Bledsoe	Republican	9
Assistant Presidents pro tempore	Bobby Pierce	Democratic	25

==== Floor Leaders ====
Office	Officer	Party	District
Majority Leader	Jim Hendren	Republican	29
Majority Whip	Jimmy Hickey Jr.	Republican	28
Minority Leader	Keith Ingram	Democratic	24
Minority Whip	Bobby Pierce	Democratic	27

== Senators ==
District	Name	Party	Residence	First elected	Seat up	Term-limited
1	Bart Hester	Rep	Cave Springs	2012	2020	2028
2	Jim Hendren	Rep	Gravette	2012	2020	2028
3	Cecile Bledsoe	Rep	Rogers	2008	2018	2018
4	Uvalde Lindsey	Dem	Fayetteville	2012	2018	2026
5	Bryan King	Rep	Green Forest	2012	2018	2024
6	Gary Stubblefield	Rep	Branch	2012	2018	2028
7	Jon Woods	Rep	Springdale	2012	2016	2024
8	Jake Files	Rep	Fort Smith	2010	2018	2024
9	Terry Rice	Rep	Waldron	2014	2018	2024
10	Larry Teague	Dem	Nashville	2008	2018	2018
11	Jimmy Hickey Jr.	Rep	Texarkana	2012	2016	2028
12	Bruce Maloch	Dem	Magnolia	2012	2016	2028
13	Alan Clark	Rep	Lonsdale	2012	2016	2028
14	Bill Sample	Rep	Hot Springs	2010	2018	2020
15	David J. Sanders	Rep	Little Rock	2012	2018	2026
16	Vacant				2018	
17	Scott Flippo	Rep	Mountain Home	2014	2018	2030
18	Missy Irvin	Rep	Mountain View	2010	2018	2026
19	Linda Collins-Smith	Rep	Pocahontas	2014	2018	2026
20	Blake Johnson	Rep	Corning	2014	2018	2030
21	John Cooper	Rep	Jonesboro	2014 (special)	2016	2032
22	David Burnett	Dem	Osceola	2010	2016	2026
23	Ron Caldwell	Rep	Wynne	2012	2016	2028
24	Keith Ingram	Dem	West Memphis	2012	2018	2024
25	Stephanie Flowers	Dem	Pine Bluff	2010	2016	2020
26	Eddie Cheatham	Dem	Crossett	2012	2016	2022
27	Bobby Pierce	Dem	Sheridan	2012	2016	2022
28	Jonathan Dismang	Rep	Beebe	2010	2016	2024
29	Eddie Joe Williams	Rep	Cabot	2010	2016	2026
30	Linda Chesterfield	Dem	Little Rock	2010	2018	2018
31	Joyce Elliott	Dem	Little Rock	2008	2014	2018
32	David Johnson	Dem	Little Rock	2008	2016	2020
33	Jeremy Hutchinson	Rep	Benton	2010	2018	2020
34	Jane English	Rep	North Little Rock	2012	2016	2026
35	Jason Rapert	Rep	Conway	2010	2018	2026

== House of Representatives ==
=== Leadership ===
Position	Name	Party	County	District
Majority Leader	Ken Bragg	Republican	Grant	15
Majority Whip	Jim Dotson	Republican	Benton	93
Majority Caucus Secretary	Charlotte Douglas	Republican	Crawford	75
Minority Leader	Eddie Armstrong	Democratic	Pulaski	37

=== Representatives ===
District	Name	Party	First elected	Term-limited
1	Prissy Hickerson	Rep	2010	2016
2	Lane Jean	Rep	2010	2016
3	Danny Watson	Rep	2016	2032
4	DeAnn Vaught	Rep	2014	2030
5	David Fielding	Dem	2010	2026
6	Matthew Shepherd	Rep	2010	2026
7	John Baine	Dem	2012	2028
8	Jeff Wardlaw	Rep	2010	2026
9	LeAnne Burch	Dem	2016	2032
10	Mike Holcomb	Rep	2012	2028
11	Mark McElroy	Dem	2012	2028
12	Chris Richey	Dem	2012	2028
13	David Hillman	Rep	2012	2028
14	Camille Bennett	Dem	2014	2030
15	Ken Bragg	Rep	2012	2028
16	Ken Ferguson	Dem	2014	2030
17	Vivian Flowers	Dem	2014	2030
18	Richard Womack	Rep	2012	2028
19	Justin Gonzales	Rep	2014	2030
20	Nate Bell	Ind	2010	2026
21	Marcus Richmond	Rep	2014	2030
22	Mickey Gates	Rep	2014	2030
23	Lanny Fite	Rep	2014	2030
26	Laurie Rushing	Rep	2014	2030
24	Bruce Cozart	Rep	2011†	2028
25	John Vines	Dem	2010	2026
27	Julie Mayberry	Rep	2014	2030
28	Kim Hammer	Rep	2010	2026
29	Fredrick Love	Dem	2010	2026
30	Charles Armstrong	Dem	2012	2028
31	Andy Davis	Rep	2012	2028
32	Jim Sorvillo	Rep	2014	2030
33	Warwick Sabin	Dem	2012	2028
34	John Walker	Dem	2010	2026
35	Clarke Tucker	Dem	2014	2030
36	Charles Blake	Dem	2014	2030
37	Eddie Armstrong	Dem	2012	2018
38	Donnie Copeland	Rep	2014	2020
39	Mark Lowery	Rep	2012	2018
40	Douglas House	Rep	2012	2028
41	Karilyn Brown	Rep	2014	2030
42	Bob Johnson	Dem	2014	2030
43	Tim Lemons	Rep	2014	2030
44	Joe Farrer	Rep	2012	2028
45	Jeremy Gillam	Rep	2010	2026
46	Les Eaves	Rep	2014	2030
47	Michael John Gray	Dem	2014	2030
48	Reginald Murdock	Dem	2010	2026
49	Marshall Wright	Dem	2010	2026
50	Milton Nicks	Dem	2014	2030
51	Deborah Ferguson	Dem	2012	2028
52	Dwight Tosh	Rep	2014	2030
53	Dan Sullivan	Rep	2014	2030
54	Johnny Rye	Rep	2016	2032
55	Monte Hodges	Dem	2012	2028
56	Joe Jett	Rep	2012	2028
57	Jimmy Gazaway	Rep	2016	2032
58	Brandt Smith	Rep	2014	2030
59	Jack Ladyman	Rep	2014	2030
60	James Ratliff	Dem	2010	2026
61	Scott Baltz	Dem	2012	2028
62	Michelle Gray	Rep	2014	2030
63	James Sturch	Rep	2014	2030
64	John Payton	Rep	2012	2018
65	Rick Beck	Rep	2014	2020
66	Josh Miller	Rep	2012	2018
67	Stephen Meeks	Rep	2010	2016
68	Trevor Drown	Rep	2014	2020
69	Betty Overbey	Dem	2010	2016
70	David Meeks	Rep	2010	2016
71	Kenneth Henderson	Rep	2014	2020
72	Stephen Magie	Dem	2012	2018
73	Mary Bentley	Rep	2014	2020
74	Jon Eubanks	Rep	2010	2016
75	Charlotte Douglas	Rep	2012	2018
76	Mathew Pitsch	Rep	2014	2020
77	Justin Boyd	Rep	2014	2020
78	George McGill	Dem	2012	2018
79	Gary Deffenbaugh	Rep	2010	2016
80	Charlene Fite	Rep	2012	2018
81	Justin Harris	Rep	2010	2016
82	Bill Gossage	Rep	2012	2018
83	David Branscum	Rep	2010	2016
84	Charlie Collins	Rep	2010	2016
85	David Whitaker	Dem	2012	2018
86	Greg Leding	Dem	2010	2016
87	Robin Lundstrum	Rep	2014	2020
88	Lance Eads	Rep	2014	2020
89	Micah Neal	Rep	2012	2028
90	Jana Della Rosa	Rep	2014	2030
91	Dan Douglas	Rep	2012	2028
92	Kim Hendren	Rep	2014	2030
93	Jim Dotson	Rep	2012	2028
94	Rebecca Petty	Rep	2014	2030
95	Sue Scott	Rep	2012	2028
96	Grant Hodges	Rep	2014	2030
97	Bob Ballinger	Rep	2012	2028
98	Ron McNair	Rep	2014	2030
99	Kelley Linck	Rep	2010	2026
100	Nelda Speaks	Rep	2014	2030

== See also ==
- List of Arkansas General Assemblies
