= 89th Arkansas General Assembly =

2013–14 session of the Arkansas state legislature

←	88th	90th	→
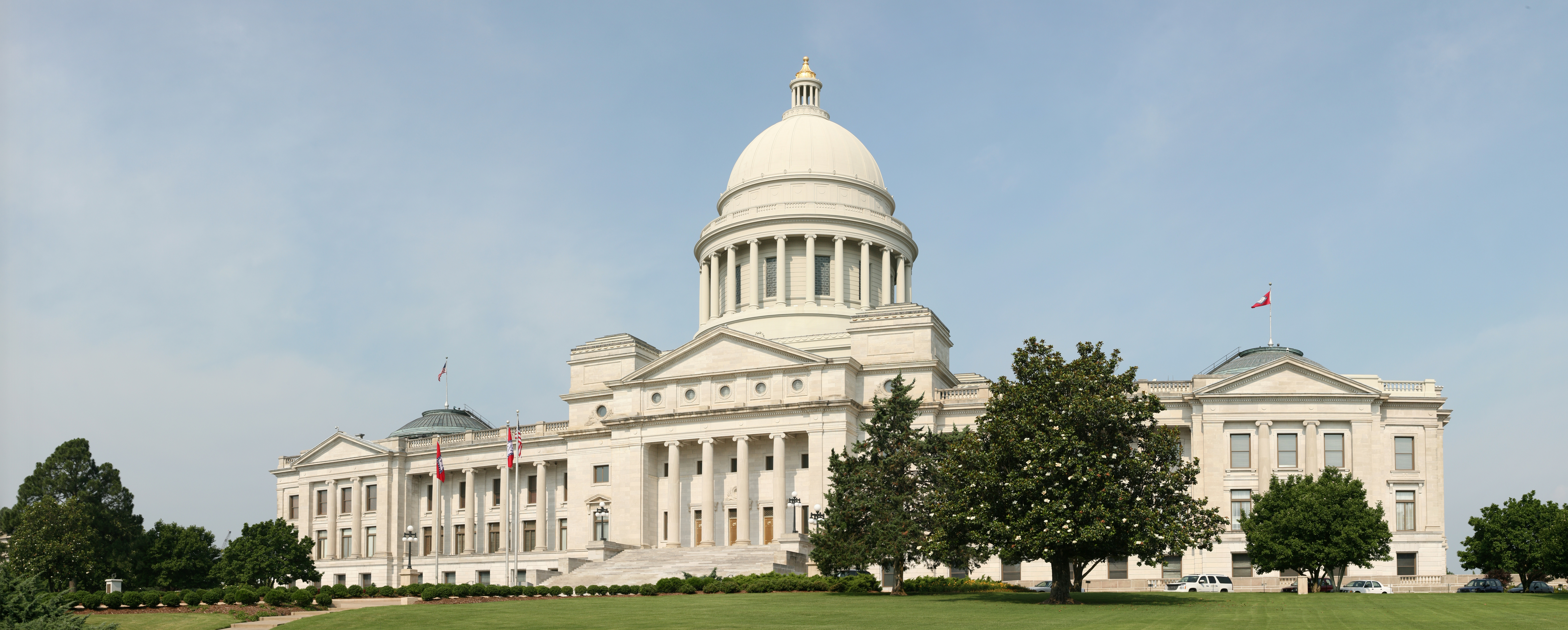
- Arkansas State Capitol (2009)

Overview
- Meeting place: Arkansas State Capitol
- Term: January 14, 2013 – February 10, 2014

Arkansas Senate
- Senate party standings
- Members: 35 (21 R, 14 D)
- President of the Senate: Mark Darr (R)
- President Pro Tempore of the Senate: Michael Lamoureux (R)
- Majority Leader: Eddie Joe Williams (R)
- Minority Leader: Keith Ingram (D)
- Party control: Republican Party

House of Representatives
- House party standings
- Members: 100 (51 R, 48 D, 1 G)
- House Speaker: Davy Carter (R)
- Speaker pro Tempore: Darrin Williams (D)
- Majority Leader: Ken Bragg (R)
- Minority Leader: David Whitaker (D)
- Party control: Republican Party

Sessions
- 1st: January 14, 2013 – May 1, 2013
- 2nd: May 1, 2013 – May 3, 2013
- 3rd: February 12, 2014 – March 12, 2014
- 4th: March 13, 2014 – March 16, 2014

The Eighty-Ninth Arkansas General Assembly was the legislative body of the state of Arkansas in 2013 and 2014. In this General Assembly, the Arkansas Senate and Arkansas House of Representatives were both controlled by the Republicans. In the Senate, 21 senators were Republicans and 14 were Democrats. In the House, 51 representatives were Republicans, 48 were Democrats, and one was Green. The 89th General Assembly was the first time both chambers were controlled by Republicans since the Reconstruction era.

== Sessions ==
The Regular Session of the 89th General Assembly opened on January 14, 2013.

It adjourned sine die May 1, 2014 and was immediately followed the First Extraordinary Session.

== Major events ==
=== Vacancies ===
- Senator Paul Bookout (D-21st) resigned January 29, 2014, following an investigation finding he spent campaign funds on personal expenses. He was replaced by John Cooper (R) via special election on January 29, 2014.
- Lieutenant Governor Mark Darr (R), resigned February 1, 2014 under threat of impeachment following an investigation finding campaign and office spending ethics violations. The lieutenant governor presides as President of the Senate, but only casts tiebreaking votes. The position remained vacant through the fiscal session until the November 2014 elections. The entire staff of the lieutenant governor's office resigned days after President Pro Tem Michael Lamoureux (R-16th) sought control over the office staff.

== Senate ==
=== Leadership ===
==== Officers ====
Office	Officer	Party	District
President/Lieutenant Governor	Mark Darr	Republican	
President Pro Tempore of the Senate	Michael Lamoureux	Republican	16
Assistant Presidents pro tempore	Missy Irvin	Republican	18
Assistant Presidents pro tempore	Jeremy Hutchinson	Republican	33
Assistant Presidents pro tempore	Bruce Holland	Republican	9
Assistant Presidents pro tempore	Stephanie Flowers	Democratic	25

==== Floor Leaders ====
Office	Officer	Party	District
Majority Leader	Eddie Joe Williams	Republican	29
Majority Whip	Jonathan Dismang	Republican	28
Minority Leader	Keith Ingram	Democratic	24
Minority Whip	Bobby J. Pierce	Democratic	27

=== Senators ===
District	Name	Party	Residence	First elected	Seat up	Term-limited
1	Bart Hester	Rep	Cave Springs	2012	2020	2028
2	Jim Hendren	Rep	Gravette	2012	2020	2028
3	Cecile Bledsoe	Rep	Rogers	2008	2018	2020
4	Uvalde Lindsey	Dem	Fayetteville	2012	2018	2026
5	Bryan King	Rep	Green Forest	2012	2018	2024
6	Gary Stubblefield	Rep	Branch	2012	2018	2028
7	Jon Woods	Rep	Springdale	2006	2020	
8	Jake Files	Rep	Fort Smith	2013	2018	
9	Bruce Holland	Rep	Greenwood	2010	2018	
10	Larry Teague	Dem	Nashville	2008	2018	2020
11	Jimmy Hickey Jr.	Rep	Texarkana	2012	2020	2028
12	Bruce Maloch	Dem	Magnolia	2012	2020	2028
13	Alan Clark	Rep	Lonsdale	2012	2020	2028
14	Bill Sample	Rep	Hot Springs	2010	2018	2020
15	David J. Sanders	Rep	Little Rock	2012	2018	2026
16	Michael Lamoureux	Rep	Russellville	2002	2020	
17	Johnny Key	Rep	Mountain Home	2002	2018	
18	Missy Irvin	Rep	Mountain View	2010	2018	2026
19	David Wyatt	Dem	Batesville	2005	2018	
20	Robert Thompson	Dem	Paragould	2014	2018	2030
21	Paul Bookout (Note: Resigned August 20, 2013. John Cooper (R) sworn January 29, 2014.)	Dem	Jonesboro	1998	2020	
22	David Burnett	Dem	Osceola	2010	2020	
23	Ron Caldwell	Rep	Wynne	2012	2020	2028
24	Keith Ingram	Dem	West Memphis	2012	2018	2024
25	Stephanie Flowers	Dem	Pine Bluff	2010	2020	2020
26	Eddie Cheatham	Dem	Crossett	2012	2020	2022
27	Bobby J. Pierce	Dem	Sheridan	2006	2020	
28	Jonathan Dismang	Rep	Beebe	2010	2020	2024
29	Eddie Joe Williams	Rep	Cabot	2010	2020	2024
30	Linda Chesterfield	Dem	Little Rock	2010	2018	2020
31	Joyce Elliott	Dem	Little Rock	2008	2018	2020
32	David Johnson	Dem	Little Rock	2004	2020	
33	Jeremy Hutchinson	Rep	Benton	2010	2018	2020
34	Jane English	Rep	North Little Rock	2012	2020	2026
35	Jason Rapert	Rep	Conway	2010	2018	2026

== House of Representatives ==
=== Leadership ===
==== Officers ====
Office	Officer	Party	District
Speaker of the Arkansas House of Representatives	Davy Carter	Republican	43
Speaker Pro Tempore	Darrin Williams	Democratic	26
Assistant Speaker pro tempore	Missy Irvin	Republican	18
Assistant Speaker pro tempore	Jeremy Hutchinson	Republican	33
Assistant Speaker pro tempore	Bruce Holland	Republican	9
Assistant Speaker pro tempore	Stephanie Flowers	Democratic	25

The Democratically-controlled 88th General Assembly elected Darrin Williams (D-26th) as speaker-designate for the 89th General Assembly. He was challenged by Terry Rice (R-21st), but won the speaker-designate election on a party line vote. When the Republicans claimed control of the House in the November 2012 elections, the House voted to vacate the prior speaker-designate election and re-open nominations. Davy Carter (R-43rd) defeated Rice to become the first Republican Speaker since the Reconstruction era.

=== Representatives ===
District	Name	Party	First elected	Term-limited
1	Prissy Hickerson	Rep	2010	
2	Lane Jean	Rep	2010	2026
3	Brent Talley	Dem	2012	
4	Fonda Hawthorne	Dem	2012	
5	David Fielding	Dem	2010	2026
6	Matthew Shepherd	Rep	2010	2026
7	John Baine	Dem	2012	
8	Jeff Wardlaw	Rep	2010	2026
9	Sheilla E. Lampkin	Dem	2010	
10	Mike Holcomb	Rep	2012	2028
11	Mark McElroy	Dem	2012	2028
12	Chris Richey	Dem	2012	2028
13	David Hillman	Dem	2012	2028
14	Walls McCrary	Dem	2008	
15	Ken Bragg	Rep	2012	2028
16	James L. Word	Dem	2008	2014
17	Henry "Hank" Wilkins, IV	Dem	1998	
18	Richard Womack	Rep	2012	2028
19	Nate Steel	Dem	2010 (special)	
20	Nate Bell	Rep	2010	
21	Terry Rice	Rep	2008	
22	Bruce Westerman	Rep	2010	
23	Ann V. Clemmer	Rep	2008	
24	Bruce Cozart	Rep	2011 (special)	2028
25	John T. Vines	Dem	2010	2016
26	David Kizzia	Dem	2012	
27	Andy Mayberry	Rep	2016	2032
28	Kim Hammer	Rep	2010	2026
29	Fredrick J. Love	Dem	2010	2026
30	Charles L. Armstrong	Dem	2012	
31	Andy Davis	Rep	2012	2028
32	Allen Kerr	Rep	2008	
33	Warwick Sabin	Dem	2012	2028
34	John Walker	Dem	2010	2026
35	John Charles Edwards	Dem	2008	
36	Darrin Williams	Dem	2008	2014
37	Eddie L. Armstrong	Dem	2012	2028
38	Patti Julian	Dem	2016	2032
39	Mark Lowery	Rep	2012	2028
40	Douglas House	Rep	2012	2028
41	Jim Nickels	Dem	2008	
42	Mark Perry	Dem	2008	
43	Davy Carter	Rep	2008	
44	Joe Farrer	Rep	2012	2028
45	Jeremy Gillam	Rep	2010	2026
46	Mark Biviano	Rep	2010	
47	Jody Dickinson	Dem	2008	
48	Reginald Murdock	Dem	2010	2026
49	Marshall Wright	Dem	2010	
50	Fred Smith	Green	2014	2030
51	Deborah Ferguson	Dem	2012	2028
52	John K. Hutchison	Rep	2012	
53	Homer Lenderman	Dem	2010	
54	Wes Wagner	Dem	2012	
55	Monte Hodges	Dem	2012	
56	Joe Jett	Dem	2012	2028
57	Mary Broadway	Dem	2012	
58	Harold Copenhaver	Dem	2012	
59	Butch Wilkins	Dem	2008	
60	James Ratliff	Dem	2010	
61	Scott Baltz	Dem	2012	2028
62	Tommy Wren	Dem	2010	
63	James McLean	Dem	2008	
64	John Payton	Rep	2012	2028
65	Tommy Thompson	Dem	2010	
66	Josh Miller	Rep	2012	2028
67	Stephen Meeks	Rep	2010	2026
68	Robert E. Dale	Rep	2008	
69	Betty Overbey	Dem	2010	
70	David Meeks	Rep	2010	2026
71	Andrea Lea	Rep	2008	
72	Stephen Magie	Dem	2012	2028
73	John Catlett	Dem	2010	
74	Jon S. Eubanks	Rep	2010	2026
75	Charlotte Vining Douglas	Rep	2012	2028
76	Denny Altes	Rep	1998	
77	Stephanie Malone	Rep	2008	
78	George B. McGill	Dem	2012	2028
79	Gary Deffenbaugh	Rep	2010	2026
80	Charlene Fite	Rep	2012	2028
81	Justin T. Harris	Rep	2010	
82	Bill Gossage	Rep	2012	
83	David L. Branscum	Rep	2010	
84	Charlie Collins	Rep	2010	2026
85	David Whitaker	Dem	2012	2028
86	Greg Leding	Dem	2010	2026
87	Jonathan Barnett	Rep	2008	2014
88	Randy Alexander	Rep	2012	
89	Micah S. Neal	Rep	2012	
90	Les "Skip" Carnine	Rep	2008	
91	Dan Douglas	Rep	2012	2028
92	Mary L. Slinkard	Rep	2008	
93	Jim Dotson	Rep	2012	2028
94	Debra M. Hobbs	Rep	2008	
95	Sue Scott	Rep	2012	
96	Duncan Baird	Rep	2008	2014
97	Bob Ballinger	Rep	2012	2028
98	John Burris	Rep	2008	
99	Kelley Linck	Rep	2010	
100	Karen S. Hopper	Rep	2008	

== See also ==
- List of Arkansas General Assemblies
