= 91st Arkansas General Assembly =

Term of state legislature in Arkansas, US

←	90th	92nd	→
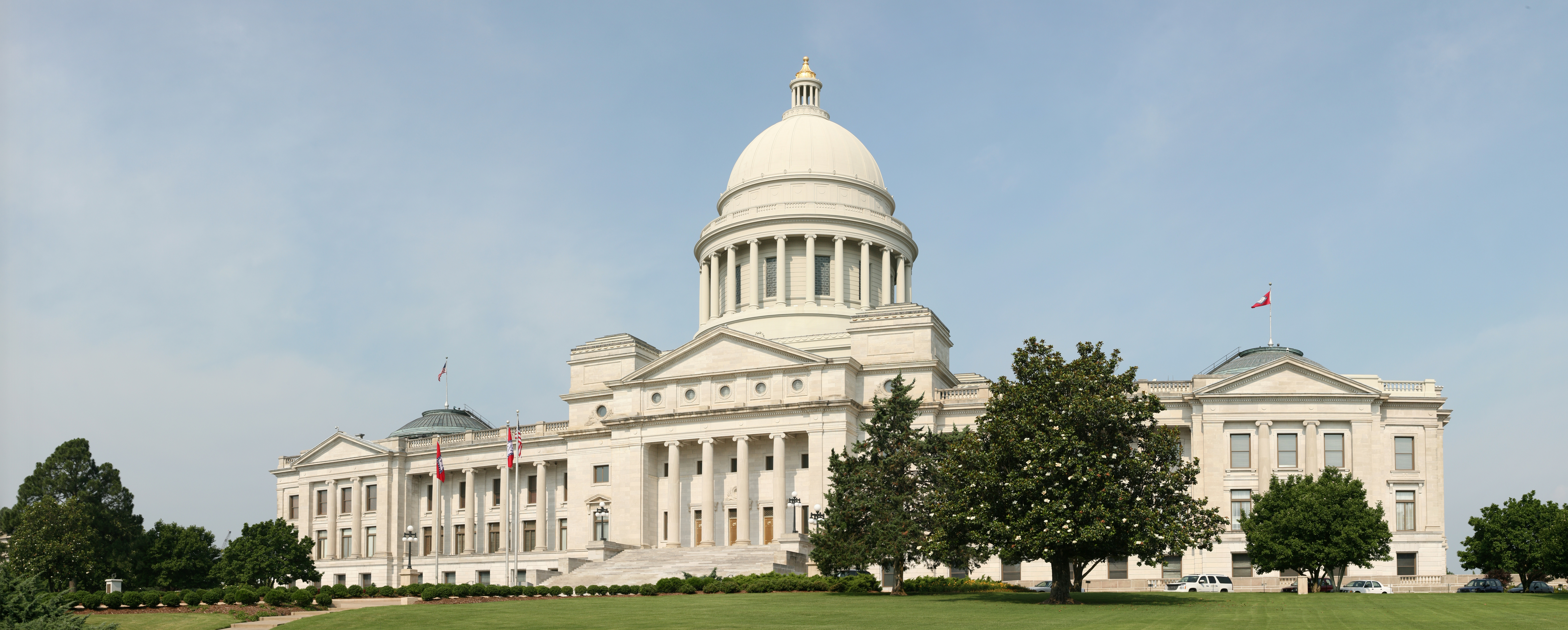
- Arkansas State Capitol (2009)

Overview
- Term: January 9, 2017 – January 14, 2019

Arkansas Senate
- Members: 34 (23 R, 11 D, 1 vacant)
- President of the Senate: Tim Griffin (R)
- President Pro Tempore of the Senate: Jonathan Dismang (R)
- Majority Leader: Jim Hendren (R)
- Minority Leader: Keith Ingram (D)
- Party control: Republican Party

House of Representatives
- Members: 100 (69 R, 30 D, 1 Independent)
- House Speaker: Jeremy Gillam (R); Matthew Shepherd (R)
- Speaker pro Tempore: Jon Eubanks (R)
- Majority Leader: Ken Bragg (R)
- Minority Leader: David Whitaker (D)
- Party control: Republican Party

Sessions
- 1st: January 9, 2017 – May 1, 2017
- 2nd: May 1, 2017 – May 3, 2017
- 3rd: February 12, 2018 – March 12, 2018
- 4th: March 13, 2018 – March 16, 2018

The Ninety-First Arkansas General Assembly was the legislative body of the state of Arkansas in 2017 and 2018. In this General Assembly, the Arkansas Senate and Arkansas House of Representatives were both controlled by the Republicans. In the Senate, 23 senators were Republicans, 11 were Democrats, and one position was vacant until April. In the House, 69 representatives were Republicans, 30 were Democrats, and one was independent.

== Sessions ==
The Regular Session of the 91st General Assembly opened on January 9, 2017. It adjourned sine die May 1, 2017, immediately followed the First Extraordinary Session.

== Major events ==
=== Corruption and scandals ===
The 91st General Assembly was marked by several scandals, indictments, and guilty pleas involving current and former legislators. Two sitting legislators resigned following charges of fraud and other crimes. Former legislators Hank Wilkins IV, Jon Woods and Micah Neal plead guilty during the 91st General Assembly, detailing a fraud and kickback scheme abusing Arkansas's General Improvement Fund. Their pleas indicated sitting members in the 91st General Assembly could be charged later.

Representative Mickey Gates (R-22nd) made national news for failing to pay taxes for 15 years, but resisted calls for his resignation.

=== Major legislation ===
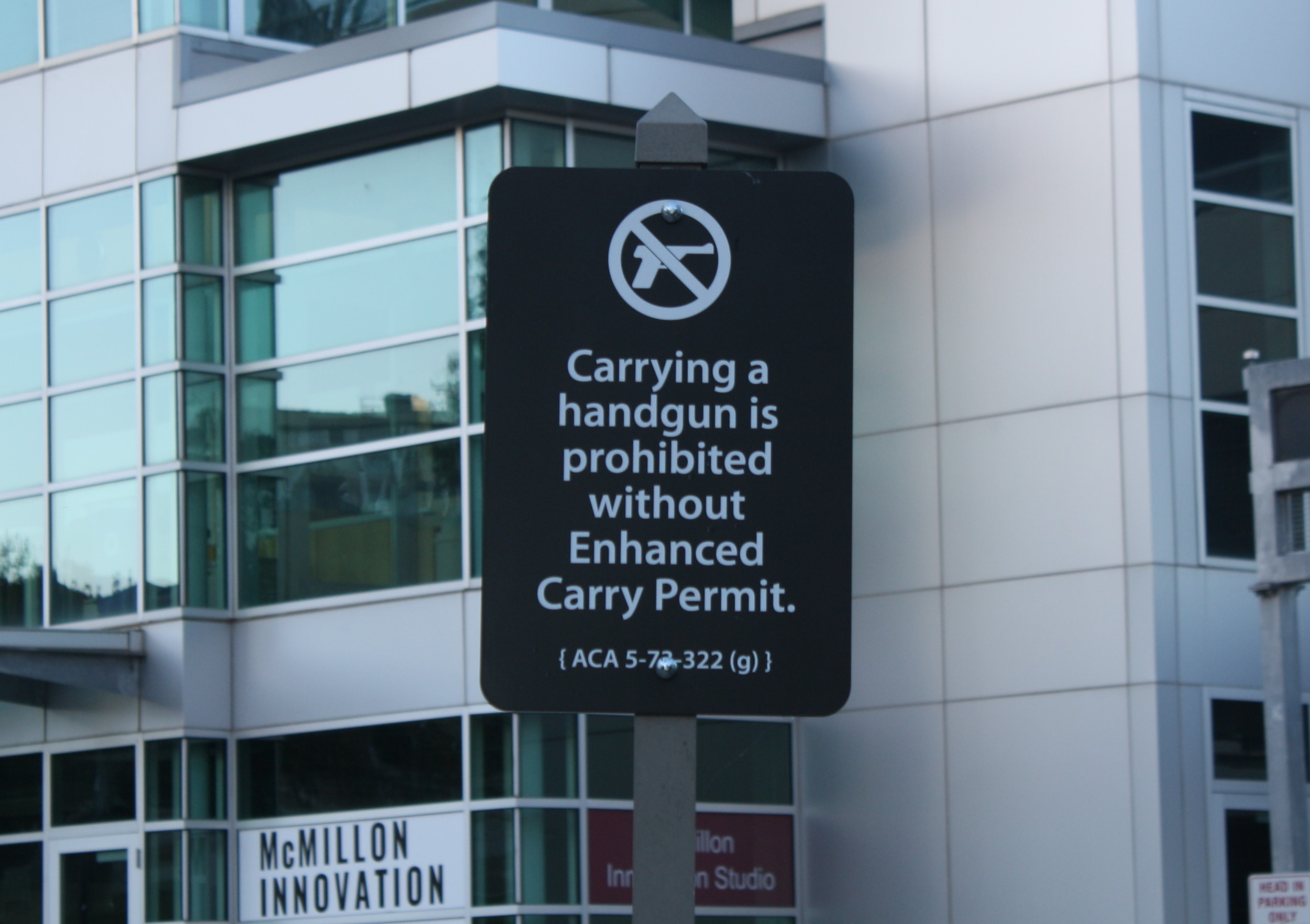
One of the most contentious pieces of legislation was "Guns on Campus"

Page not found! - Arkansas State Legislature Page not found! - Arkansas State Legislature

=== Vacancies ===
- Senator Greg Standridge (R-16th) died November 16, 2017. He was replaced by Breanne Davis (R) via special election on May 22, 2018.
- Senator Eddie Joe Williams (R-29th) resigned November 15, 2017 to serve as President Donald Trump's (R) representative to the Southern States Energy Board. He was replaced by Ricky Hill (R) via special election on May 22, 2018.
- Representative David Branscum (R-83rd) resigned November 17, 2017 to become Arkansas's rural development director for the U.S. Department of Agriculture. He was replaced by Donald Ragland (R) via special election on May 22, 2018.
- Speaker Jeremy Gillam (R-45th) resigned June 15, 2018 to become director of governmental affairs and external relations at the University of Central Arkansas. Gillam's seat in the 45th District remained vacant, though Matthew Shepherd took over as speaker on June 15, 2018.
- Senator Jake Files (R-8th) resigned February 9, 2018, following a federal wire fraud, bank fraud, and money laundering guilty plea. He was replaced by Frank Glidewell (R) via special election on August 14, 2018.
- Senator Jeremy Hutchinson (R-33rd) resigned August 31, 2018, following a federal grand jury indictment of eight counts of wire fraud and four counts of filing false tax returns.

== Senate ==
=== Leadership ===
==== Officers ====
Office	Officer	Party	District
President/Lieutenant Governor	Tim Griffin	Republican	
President Pro Tempore of the Senate	Jonathan Dismang	Republican	16
Assistant Presidents pro tempore	Missy Irvin	Republican	18
Assistant Presidents pro tempore	David J. Sanders	Republican	15
Assistant Presidents pro tempore	Cecile Bledsoe	Republican	9
Assistant Presidents pro tempore	Stephanie Flowers	Democratic	25

==== Floor Leaders ====
Office	Officer	Party	District
Majority Leader	Jim Hendren	Republican	29
Majority Whip	Bart Hester	Republican	1
Minority Leader	Keith Ingram	Democratic	24
Minority Whip	Will Bond	Democratic	32

Source: Arkansas Senate

=== Senators ===
District	Name	Party	Residence	First elected	Seat up	Term-limited
1	Bart Hester	Rep	Cave Springs	2012	2020	2028
2	Jim Hendren	Rep	Gravette	2012	2020	2028
3	Cecile Bledsoe	Rep	Rogers	2008	2018	2020
4	Uvalde Lindsey	Dem	Fayetteville	2012	2018	2026
5	Bryan King	Rep	Green Forest	2012	2018	2024
6	Gary Stubblefield	Rep	Branch	2012	2018	2028
7	Lance Eads	Rep	Springdale	2016	2020	2032
8	Jake Files	Rep	Fort Smith	2013	2018	
9	Terry Rice	Rep	Waldron	2014	2018	2024
10	Larry Teague	Dem	Nashville	2008	2018	2020
11	Jimmy Hickey Jr.	Rep	Texarkana	2012	2020	2028
12	Bruce Maloch	Dem	Magnolia	2012	2020	2028
13	Alan Clark	Rep	Lonsdale	2012	2020	2028
14	Bill Sample	Rep	Hot Springs	2010	2018	2020
15	David J. Sanders	Rep	Little Rock	2012	2018	2026
16	Greg Standridge	Rep	Russellville	2015 (special)	2020	
17	Scott Flippo	Rep	Mountain Home	2014	2018	2030
18	Missy Irvin	Rep	Mountain View	2010	2018	2026
19	Linda Collins-Smith	Rep	Pocahontas	2014	2018	2026
20	Blake Johnson	Rep	Corning	2014	2018	2030
21	John Cooper	Rep	Jonesboro	2014 (special)	2020	2032
22	David Wallace	Rep	Leachville	2016	2020	2026
23	Ron Caldwell	Rep	Wynne	2012	2020	2028
24	Keith Ingram	Dem	West Memphis	2012	2018	2024
25	Stephanie Flowers	Dem	Pine Bluff	2010	2020	2020
26	Eddie Cheatham	Dem	Crossett	2012	2020	2022
27	Trent Garner	Rep	El Dorado	2016	2020	2032
28	Jonathan Dismang	Rep	Beebe	2010	2020	2024
29	Eddie Joe Williams	Rep	Cabot	2010	2020	2024
30	Linda Chesterfield	Dem	Little Rock	2010	2018	2020
31	Joyce Elliott	Dem	Little Rock	2008	2018	2020
32	Will Bond	Dem	Little Rock	2016	2020	2020
33	Jeremy Hutchinson	Rep	Benton	2010	2018	2020
34	Jane English	Rep	North Little Rock	2012	2020	2026
35	Jason Rapert	Rep	Conway	2010	2018	2026

== House of Representatives ==
=== Representatives ===
District	Name	Party	First elected	Term-limited
1	Carol Dalby	Rep	2016	2032
2	Lane Jean	Rep	2010	2026
3	Danny Watson	Rep	2016	2032
4	DeAnn Vaught	Rep	2014	2030
5	David Fielding	Dem	2010	2026
6	Matthew Shepherd	Rep	2010	2026
7	Sonia Eubanks Barker	Rep	2016	2032
8	Jeff Wardlaw	Rep	2010	2026
9	LeAnne Burch	Dem	2016	2032
10	Mike Holcomb	Rep	2012	2028
11	Mark McElroy	Dem	2012	2028
12	Chris Richey	Dem	2012	2028
13	David Hillman	Rep	2012	2028
14	Roger Lynch	Rep	2016	2032
15	Ken Bragg	Rep	2012	2028
16	Ken Ferguson	Dem	2014	2030
17	Vivian Flowers	Dem	2014	2030
18	Richard Womack	Rep	2012	2028
19	Justin Gonzales	Rep	2014	2030
20	John Maddox	Rep	2016	2032
21	Marcus Richmond	Rep	2014	2030
22	Mickey Gates	Rep	2014	2030
23	Lanny Fite	Rep	2014	2030
26	Laurie Rushing	Rep	2014	2030
24	Bruce Cozart	Rep	2011†	2028
25	Les Warren	Rep	2016	2032
27	Andy Mayberry	Rep	2016	2032
28	Kim Hammer	Rep	2010	2026
29	Fredrick Love	Dem	2010	2026
30	Fred Allen	Dem	2016	2032
31	Andy Davis	Rep	2012	2028
32	Jim Sorvillo	Rep	2014	2030
33	Warwick Sabin	Dem	2012	2028
34	John Walker	Dem	2010	2026
35	Clarke Tucker	Dem	2014	2030
36	Charles Blake	Dem	2014	2030
37	Eddie Armstrong	Dem	2012	2028
38	Carlton Wing	Rep	2016	2032
39	Mark Lowery	Rep	2012	2028
40	Douglas House	Rep	2012	2028
41	Karilyn Brown	Rep	2014	2030
42	Bob Johnson	Dem	2014	2030
43	Tim Lemons	Rep	2014	2030
44	Joe Farrer	Rep	2012	2028
45	Jeremy Gillam	Rep	2010	2026
46	Les Eaves	Rep	2014	2030
47	Michael John Gray	Dem	2014	2030
48	Reginald Murdock	Dem	2010	2026
49	Steve Hollowell	Rep	2016	2032
50	Milton Nicks	Dem	2014	2030
51	Deborah Ferguson	Dem	2012	2028
52	Dwight Tosh	Rep	2014	2030
53	Dan Sullivan	Rep	2014	2030
54	Johnny Rye	Rep	2016	2032
55	Monte Hodges	Dem	2012	2028
56	Joe Jett	Rep	2012	2028
57	Jimmy Gazaway	Rep	2016	2032
58	Brandt Smith	Rep	2014	2030
59	Jack Ladyman	Rep	2014	2030
60	Frances Cavenaugh	Rep	2016	2032
61	Scott Baltz	Dem	2012	2028
62	Michelle Gray	Rep	2014	2030
63	James Sturch	Rep	2014	2030
64	John Payton	Rep	2012	2028
65	Rick Beck	Rep	2014	2030
66	Josh Miller	Rep	2012	2028
67	Stephen Meeks	Rep	2010	2026
68	Trevor Drown	Rep	2014	2030
69	Aaron Pilkington	Rep	2016	2032
70	David Meeks	Rep	2010	2026
71	Kenneth Henderson	Rep	2014	2030
72	Stephen Magie	Dem	2012	2028
73	Mary Bentley	Rep	2014	2030
74	Jon Eubanks	Rep	2010	2026
75	Charlotte Douglas	Rep	2012	2028
76	Mathew Pitsch	Rep	2014	2030
77	Justin Boyd	Rep	2014	2030
78	George McGill	Dem	2012	2028
79	Gary Deffenbaugh	Rep	2010	2026
80	Charlene Fite	Rep	2012	2028
81	Bruce Coleman	Rep	2016	2032
82	Sarah Capp	Rep	2016	2032
83	Donald Ragland	Rep	2018	2034
84	Charlie Collins	Rep	2010	2026
85	David Whitaker	Dem	2012	2028
86	Greg Leding	Dem	2010	2026
87	Robin Lundstrum	Rep	2014	2030
88	Clint Penzo	Rep	2016	2032
89	Jeff Williams	Rep	2016	2032
90	Jana Della Rosa	Rep	2014	2030
91	Dan Douglas	Rep	2012	2028
92	Kim Hendren	Rep	2014	2030
93	Jim Dotson	Rep	2012	2028
94	Rebecca Petty	Rep	2014	2030
95	Austin McCollum	Rep	2016	2032
96	Grant Hodges	Rep	2014	2030
97	Bob Ballinger	Rep	2012	2028
98	Ron McNair	Rep	2014	2030
99	Jack Fortner	Rep	2016	2032
100	Nelda Speaks	Rep	2014	2030

== See also ==
- List of Arkansas General Assemblies
