= Isaac Norman Moore Sr. =

Arkansas politician (1876–1955)

Isaac Norman Moore Sr. (1876–1955) was an American lawyer and state senator in Arkansas. In 1945 he was chosen unopposed to be Secretary of the Arkansas Senate. A lawyer, Moore represented Lincoln County, Arkansas and Desha County in 1935.

He lived in Dumas, Arkansas. Thirteen term sheriff of Desha County Robert Moore was his son. Robert S. Moore Jr. is his grandson.
