= Rebecca Petty =

American politician (born 1970)

Rebecca Dean Petty

Member of the Arkansas House of Representatives from the 94th district
- In office January 2015 – January 11, 2021
- Preceded by: Debra Hobbs
- Succeeded by: John P. Carr

Personal details
- Born: April 13, 1970 (age 56) Wichita, Kansas, U.S.
- Party: Republican
- Education: Hatfield (Arkansas) High School; Tulsa Community College Arkansas Tech University John Brown University
- Occupation: Advocate for crime victims and exploited children

Rebecca Dean Petty (born April 13, 1970), also known as Rebecca DeMauro, is an American politician and activist from Rogers, Arkansas. After her 12-year-old daughter, Andria Brewer, was murdered in 1999, she became an advocate for victims of violent crime. She is also a former Republican member of the Arkansas House of Representatives from the 94th district. The district she represented encompasses a part of Benton County in the northwest Arkansas, her adopted state.

== Background ==
Petty was born in Wichita, Kansas, and graduated in 1988 from Hatfield High School in Hatfield, Arkansas. Petty also attended Tulsa Community College in Tulsa, Oklahoma and earned a Bachelor of Science in Criminal Justice in 2013 from Arkansas Tech University at Russellville, where she was inducted into the Alpha Chi honor society. She has since pursued a master's degree in leadership and ethics at the private John Brown University in Siloam Springs in Benton County.

== Murder of Andria Brewer ==
On May 15, 1999, Rebecca Petty's 12-year-old daughter, Andria 'Andi' Brewer, was reported missing near Mena, Arkansas. According to court filings, local police called the Arkansas State Police and the FBI after deeming it unlikely that Brewer had run away. On May 17, a polygraph test of two suspects by the State Police yielded a confession from one, Karl Roberts, Brewer's paternal uncle. Roberts admitted to taking Brewer from her home in his red pickup truck, driving her to nearby woods, raping her, strangling her, and then hiding the body.

On May 24, 2000, Roberts was sentenced to death and as of 2025 he remains on death row. While Rebecca Petty advocated for the death penalty for Roberts in the decades following her daughter's murder, she later wrote an article for The Forgiveness Project saying that she had forgiven him.

Petty's experience led her to write articles on WattPad. She later published a book about the murder, Stolen, in July 2023.

== Career ==
From 2000 to 2008, Petty was the executive director of The Andi Foundation for Children. Since 2009, she has been a Crime Victim/Child Advocate consultant for the National Criminal Justice Training Center at Fox Valley Technical College in Appleton, Wisconsin. She is a founding member of the Surviving Parents Coalition, a group which advocates for laws preventing violence against children. Petty also works with the United States Department of Justice on training for Amber alerts. She advocates "keeping our children safe from sexual predators by equipping our police with the tools they need to put criminals behind bars."

Petty is active in the Benton County Republican Party. In the low-turnout primary on May 20, 2014, she defeated Margaret "Marge" Wolf (born c. 1937), a former Wisconsin resident, a member of the Rogers City Council, and the president of the Northwest Arkansas Food Bank. Petty polled 878 votes (55.3 percent) to Wolf's 710 (44.7 percent). The House seat was vacated by the term-limited Debra Hobbs, who ran unsuccessfully for the Republican nomination for lieutenant governor; Hobbs was defeated by Tim Griffin, the former U.S. representative for Arkansas's 2nd congressional district. Petty carried the endorsement of State Senator Bart Hester of Cave Springs.

In the November 4 general election, Petty defeated the Democratic nominee, Grimsley Graham (born c. 1948), an English teacher at Rogers High School for thirty years, 3,508 votes (57.8 percent) to 2,565 (42.2 percent), in a heavily Republican year statewide and nationally.

Representative Petty held these committee assignments:

1. Vice-chair of the House Judiciary Committee;
2. Aging, Children and Youth, Legislative, and Military Affairs; and
3. House Rules Committee.

In January 2015, Petty proposed legislation before the House Judiciary Committee to allow families of murder victims to witness the executions of the convicted criminals so as to gain some closure to their grief. The legislation passed both houses and was soon signed into law by Republican Governor Asa Hutchinson. The next month Petty proposed legislation to allow executions in Arkansas by firing squad.

In February 2015, Petty joined dozens of her fellow Republicans and two Democrats in co-sponsoring legislation submitted by Representative Lane Jean of Magnolia to reduce unemployment compensation benefits. The measure was signed into law by Governor Hutchinson.

The same month, she supported House Bill 1228—sponsored by Bob Ballinger of Carroll County—which sought to prohibit government from imposing a burden on the free exercise of religion. The measure passed the House seventy-two to twenty. One of the opponents, Representative Camille Bennett, a former city attorney for Lonoke, Arkansas, called for a reworking of the legislation. Bennett claimed the Ballinger bill would establish a "type of religious litmus test" which could impact nearly any law under consideration by the legislature. The measure was subsequently passed by a large margin in the House and signed into law in revised form, SB 975, by Governor Hutchinson.

Petty did not run for reelection in 2020 and left the Arkansas House in January 2021.

== Personal life ==
Petty lists her religious affiliation as a non-denominational Christian. She is married to her third husband, William. She has two surviving daughters and two grandchildren.

Preceded by Debra Hobbs	Arkansas State Representative for District 94 (Benton County); 2015–	Succeeded by Incumbent
