= List of Arkansas General Assemblies =

List of Arkansas state legislatures

The following is a list of legislative terms of the Arkansas General Assembly, the law-making branch of government of the U.S. state of Arkansas. Arkansas became part of the United States on June 15, 1836.

== Territorial legislatures, 1819-1835 ==
- 1st General Assembly of Arkansas Territory, 1819-1820
- 2nd General Assembly of Arkansas Territory, 1821
- 3rd General Assembly of Arkansas Territory, 1823
- 4th General Assembly of Arkansas Territory, 1825
- 5th General Assemblyof Arkansas Territory, 1827
- 6th General Assembly of Arkansas Territory, 1829
- 7th General Assembly of Arkansas Territory, 1831
- 8th General Assembly of Arkansas Territory, 1833
- 9th General Assembly of Arkansas Territory, 1835

== State legislatures, 1836-present ==
Name	Start date	End date	Last election
Arkansas Constitution of 1836
1st Arkansas General Assembly	September 12, 1836	March 5, 1838	
2nd Arkansas General Assembly	November 5, 1838	December 17, 1838	
3rd Arkansas General Assembly	November 2, 1840	December 28, 1840	
4th Arkansas General Assembly	1842		
5th Arkansas General Assembly	1844		
6th Arkansas General Assembly	1846		
7th Arkansas General Assembly	1848		
8th Arkansas General Assembly	1850		
9th Arkansas General Assembly	1852		
10th Arkansas General Assembly	1854		
11th Arkansas General Assembly	1856		
12th Arkansas General Assembly	1858		
13th Arkansas General Assembly	1860		
Arkansas Constitution of 1861
14th Arkansas General Assembly	1862		
15th Arkansas General Assembly	1864		
Arkansas Constitution of 1864
16th Arkansas General Assembly	1866		
17th Arkansas General Assembly	1868		
Arkansas Constitution of 1868
18th Arkansas General Assembly	1871		
19th Arkansas General Assembly	1873		
20th Arkansas General Assembly	1874		
Arkansas Constitution of 1874
21st Arkansas General Assembly	1877		
22nd Arkansas General Assembly	1879		
23rd Arkansas General Assembly	1881		
24th Arkansas General Assembly	1883		
25th Arkansas General Assembly	1885		
26th Arkansas General Assembly	1887		
27th Arkansas General Assembly	1889		
28th Arkansas General Assembly	1891		
29th Arkansas General Assembly	1893		
30th Arkansas General Assembly	1895		
31st Arkansas General Assembly	1897		
32nd Arkansas General Assembly	January 10, 1899		
33rd Arkansas General Assembly	January 14, 1901		
34th Arkansas General Assembly	1903		
35th Arkansas General Assembly	1905		
36th Arkansas General Assembly	1907		
37th Arkansas General Assembly	1909		
38th Arkansas General Assembly	1911		
39th Arkansas General Assembly	1913		
40th Arkansas General Assembly	1915		
41st Arkansas General Assembly	1917		
42nd Arkansas General Assembly	1919		
43rd Arkansas General Assembly	1921		
44th Arkansas General Assembly	1923		
45th Arkansas General Assembly	1925		
46th Arkansas General Assembly	1927		
47th Arkansas General Assembly	1929		
48th Arkansas General Assembly	1931		
49th Arkansas General Assembly	1933		
50th Arkansas General Assembly	1935		
51st Arkansas General Assembly	1937		
52nd Arkansas General Assembly	1939		
53rd Arkansas General Assembly	1941		
54th Arkansas General Assembly	1943		
55th Arkansas General Assembly	1945		
56th Arkansas General Assembly	1947		
57th Arkansas General Assembly	1949		
58th Arkansas General Assembly	1951		
59th Arkansas General Assembly	1953		
60th Arkansas General Assembly	1955		
61st Arkansas General Assembly	1957		
62nd Arkansas General Assembly	1959		
63rd Arkansas General Assembly	1961		
64th Arkansas General Assembly	1963		
65th Arkansas General Assembly	1965		
66th Arkansas General Assembly	1967		
67th Arkansas General Assembly	1969		
68th Arkansas General Assembly	1971		
69th Arkansas General Assembly	1973		
70th Arkansas General Assembly	1975		
71st Arkansas General Assembly	1977		
72nd Arkansas General Assembly	1979		
73rd Arkansas General Assembly	1981		
74th Arkansas General Assembly	1983		
75th Arkansas General Assembly	1985		
76th Arkansas General Assembly	1987		
77th Arkansas General Assembly	1989		
78th Arkansas General Assembly	1991		
79th Arkansas General Assembly	1993		
80th Arkansas General Assembly	1995		
81st Arkansas General Assembly	1997		
82nd Arkansas General Assembly	1999		
83rd Arkansas General Assembly	2001		
84th Arkansas General Assembly	2003		
85th Arkansas General Assembly	2005		
86th Arkansas General Assembly	2007		
87th Arkansas General Assembly	2009		
88th Arkansas General Assembly	2011		
89th Arkansas General Assembly	2013		
90th Arkansas General Assembly	2015		
91st Arkansas General Assembly	2017		
92nd Arkansas General Assembly	2019		
93rd Arkansas General Assembly	2021		November 2020: House, Senate
94th Arkansas General Assembly	2023		November 2022: House, Senate
95th Arkansas General Assembly	2025		November 5, 2024: House, Senate

== See also ==
- List of speakers of the Arkansas House of Representatives
- List of presidents pro tempore of the Arkansas Senate
- List of governors of Arkansas
- Politics of Arkansas
- Elections in Arkansas
- Arkansas State Capitol
- Historical outline of Arkansas
- Lists of United States state legislative sessions
