= Jim Nickels =

American politician

Member of the Arkansas House of Representatives from the 41st district
- In office January 14, 2013 – January 2015
- Preceded by: Ed Garner
- Succeeded by: Karilyn Brown

Member of the Arkansas House of Representatives from the 43rd district
- In office January 2009 – January 14, 2013
- Preceded by: Jeff Wood
- Succeeded by: Davy Carter

Personal details
- Born: September 10, 1947 (age 79) Hot Springs, Arkansas
- Party: Democratic
- Education: Henderson State University; University of Arkansas School of Law
- Profession: Attorney

Military service
- Branch/service: United States Army
- Years of service: 1970–1972

Jim Nickels (born September 10, 1947, in Hot Springs, Arkansas) is an American politician and a Democratic former member of the Arkansas House of Representatives representing District 41 from January 14, 2013, to 2015. Nickels also served from January 2009 until January 2013 in the District 43 seat.

== Early life ==
=== Education ===
Nickels earned his BA and MA in sociology from Henderson State University and his JD from University of Arkansas School of Law.

=== Military service ===
Nickels served in the United States Army 1970–1972.

== Elections ==
- 2012 Redistricted to District 41, with Representative Ed Garner running for Arkansas Senate, Nickels was unopposed for the May 22, 2012 Democratic primary and won the November 6, 2012 general election with 6,700 votes (52.0%) against Republican nominee Alan Lewis Pogue (born c. 1957), also of Sherwood.
- 2008 Initially in District 43, when Jeff Wood left the Legislature and left the seat open, Nickels was unopposed for the May 20, 2008 Democratic Primary and won the November 4, 2008 General election with 7,181 votes (52.3%) against Republican nominee Steven Meckfessel.
- 2010 Nickels was unopposed for both the May 18, 2010 Democratic Primary and the November 2, 2010 General election.
