= Ecclesia College =

Private Christian work college in Springdale, Arkansas

- Royals of Ecclesia College
- Type: Private work college
- Established: 1975
- Religious affiliation: Evangelical Christianity
- President: Randall E. Bell
- Students: 178 FTE (Fall 2013)
- Location: Springdale, Arkansas, United States; 36°12′51″N 94°14′12″W
- Campus: Rural
- Sporting affiliations: NCCAA Division I – Central
- Mascot: Royals
- Website: www.ecollege.edu

Ecclesia College is a private evangelical Christian work college in Springdale, Arkansas, United States. It is accredited by the Association for Biblical Higher Education. The college was founded in 1975 by Oren Paris II, the college's first chancellor and the father of recording artist Twila Paris.

== Name ==
The college's name is derived from the Latin word ecclesia, derived in turn from the Ancient Greek term ἐκκλησία which means "called-out ones". It was used in ancient Greece to describe those who had been called out from general society to come aside and discuss the affairs of state; it is commonly translated as "church" or "assembly".

== History ==
- Jun 1975, Oren and Inez Paris, accompanied by their children and Oren's parents, veterans of the ministry, established Ecclesia Inc.
- 1976, the school enjoyed a strong and autonomous relationship with Youth With A Mission, "an international movement of Christians dedicated to serving Jesus throughout the world."
- 1996, Ecclesia College applied for membership in the Association for Biblical Higher Education.
- Mar 1997, Ecclesia's Board of Governance inaugurated Oren Paris III as the new president.
- Jul 2003, Ecclesia's Board of Governance named Oren Paris II as Chancellor
- Mar 2004, the board confirmed the president's installation of Administrative Council members: the Academic Dean, the Assistant Dean, and four Director positions over Business and Finance, Student Services, Communications and Advancement.
- 2005, Ecclesia received accreditation and offers degrees both on campus and online.
- Jul 2009, Ecclesia College became a member of the National Association of Independent Colleges and Universities (NAICU).
- Jun 2012, Founder and Chancellor, Oren Paris II, died. His wife of 56 years, Inez Paris, was installed as Chancellor the following July.
- Jun 2015, marked Ecclesia's 40th anniversary.
- April 2018, Oren Paris III resigns as president.
- April 2018, Ecclesia's board of Governance inaugurated Dr. Randall Bell as the new president.

=== 2017 bribery scandal ===
On January 4, 2017, Arkansas legislator Micah Neal pleaded guilty to conspiring to direct $600,000 in state government funds to Ecclesia College and another non-profit in exchange for $38,000 in bribes. The plea agreement also singled out the president of the college (Oren Paris III) as being directly involved with the conspiracy.

On March 2, 2017, former State Senator, Jon Woods, was indicted on 13 charges by a grand jury in connection to the kickback and bribery scheme. He faced 11 counts of honest services wire fraud, one count of money laundering, and one count of honest services mail fraud. The indictment outlined the scheme to steer General Improvement Fund money from the state legislature to projects supported through funding distributed by the Northwest Arkansas Development District. The indictment also named the president of Ecclesia College in Springdale, Oren Paris III, who is facing nine counts of honest services wire fraud and one count of honest services mail fraud after receiving funding from GIF monies. The college is not listed in the indictment. An Alma man, Randell G. Shelton Jr., is also listed in the indictment as part of an unnamed consulting company that was used to pay and conceal the kickbacks that Woods and Neal were allegedly receiving.

Both Shelton and Paris initially pleaded not guilty during arraignment hearings. Paris changed his plea to guilty on April 4, 2018, and resigned as president of Ecclesia College.

== Accreditation ==
Ecclesia College receives institutional accreditation for higher education with the Association for Biblical Higher Education (ABHE) and has been accredited by ABHE since 2005. Ecclesia is also approved by the Arkansas Course Transfer System (ACTS) which allows a student to transfer their transferable hours from Ecclesia to any college or university in the state of Arkansas.
