= Walls McCrary =

American politician

Member of the Arkansas House of Representatives from the 14th district
- In office January 14, 2013 – January 2015
- Succeeded by: Camille Bennett

Member of the Arkansas House of Representatives from the 15th district
- In office January 2009 – January 14, 2013
- Preceded by: Lenville Evans

Personal details
- Born: May 7, 1943 (age 83) Little Rock, Arkansas
- Party: Democratic
- Children: Two sons
- Education: University of Arkansas
- Profession: Merchant/Farmer

J. Walls McCrary is an American politician and a Democratic former member of the Arkansas House of Representatives representing District 14 from January 14, 2013, to January 2015. McCrary served consecutively from January 2009 until January 2013 in the District 15 seat.

== Education ==
McCrary attended the University of Arkansas at Fayetteville, from which he graduated in 1965 with a BSBA degree.

== Elections ==
- 2012 Redistricted to District 14, with Representative Tiffany Rogers running for Arkansas Senate, McCrary was unopposed for both the May 22, 2012 Democratic Primary and the November 6, 2012 General election.
- 2008 Initially in District 15, when Lenville Evans ran for Arkansas Senate and left the seat open, McCrary was unopposed for the May 20, 2008 Democratic Primary and won the three-way November 4, 2008 General election with 5,736 votes (55.2%) against Republican nominee Doug Hatcher (who had run for the seat in 2002) and Independent candidate Trent Eilts.
- 2010 McCrary was unopposed for both the May 18, 2010 Democratic Primary and the November 2, 2010 General election.
