= Lenville Evans =

American politician

Member of the Arkansas House of Representatives from the 15th district
- In office January 13, 2003 – January 12, 2009
- Preceded by: John Paul Verkamp
- Succeeded by: Walls McCrary

Personal details
- Born: July 5, 1942 (age 82); Little Rock, Arkansas
- Political party: Democratic

Lenville Evans (born July 5, 1942) is an American politician who served in the Arkansas House of Representatives from the 15th district from 2003 to 2009.
