= Robert S. Moore Jr. =

American politician (born 1945)

Member of the Arkansas House of Representatives from the 12th district
- In office January 2007 – January 2013
- Preceded by: Randy Morton Rankin
- Succeeded by: Chris Richey

Speaker of the Arkansas House of Representatives
- In office 2011–2013
- Preceded by: Robbie Wills
- Succeeded by: Davy Carter

Personal details
- Born: January 1, 1945 (age 81)
- Party: Democratic
- Spouse: Beverly Moore
- Children: Rob Moore, Lee Moore
- Education: Ouachita Baptist University (1966); University of Arkansas School of Law (JD, 1973)
- Profession: Farmer, businessman, lawyer, politician

Robert Smith Moore Jr. (born January 1, 1945) is an American farmer and politician. He was a member of the Arkansas House of Representatives, serving from 2007 to 2013. He is a member of the Democratic party.

== Early life ==
Moore served in the U.S. Army and in the Vietnam War. He worked as an Assistant Attorney General under Jim Guy Tucker, and later opened a private law practice from 1981 to 1985. Moore was appointed as Chairman of the Arkansas Transportation Commission in 1977 by Governor David Pryor. Moore also served as longtime director of the Arkansas Alcoholic Beverage Control Board.

== Political career ==
Moore ran to represent the 12th District, winning the Democratic primary and general election without opposition.

While in the House, Moore served on the House Revenue and Taxation Committee and the House Agriculture, Forestry and Economic Development Committee, Joint Budget Committee, the Legislative Joint Auditing Committee and the Arkansas Legislative Council. Moore worked on transportation and highway issues throughout his time in the House. Moore was reelected without opposition in 2008 and 2010, but declined to run for reelection in 2012.

He served as the Speaker of the House in the 88th Arkansas General Assembly.

Moore was appointed to a ten-year term on the Arkansas State Highway Commission by Governor Mike Beebe in January 2013.
