= Marshall Wright (politician) =

American politician

Member of the Arkansas House of Representatives from the 49th district
- In office January 2013 – January 2017
- Preceded by: Jeremy Gillam
- Succeeded by: Steve Hollowell

Member of the Arkansas House of Representatives from the 51st district
- In office January 2011 – January 2013
- Preceded by: David Dunn
- Succeeded by: Deborah Ferguson

Personal details
- Born: Marshall Alan Wright; April 13, 1976 (age 50) Los Angeles, California, USA
- Party: Democratic
- Spouse: Kristen Collier Wright
- Children: Two children
- Education: University of Arkansas at Fayetteville (BSBA); University of Arkansas School of Law (JD)
- Occupation: Lawyer

Marshall Alan Wright (born April 13, 1976) is an American lawyer from Forrest City, Arkansas, who is a former Democratic member of the Arkansas House of Representatives.

| Preceded by David Dunn | Arkansas State Representative for District 51; 2011–2013 | Succeeded by Deborah Ferguson |
| Preceded by Jeremy Gillam (transferred to District 45) | Arkansas State Representative for District 49 (Monroe, St. Francis, Lee, and Woodruff counties); 2013–2017 | Succeeded by Steve Hollowell |
