= Jonathan Dismang =

American politician (born 1979)

Member of the Arkansas Senate
- In office January 10, 2011 – September 15, 2026
- Preceded by: John Paul Capps
- Succeeded by: Vacant
- Constituency: 29th district (2011–2013); 28th district (2013–2023); 18th district (2023–2026)

President pro tempore of the Arkansas Senate
- In office January 15, 2015 – January 14, 2019
- Preceded by: Michael Lamoureux
- Succeeded by: Jim Hendren

Member of the Arkansas House of Representatives from the 49th district
- In office January 2009 – January 10, 2011
- Preceded by: Mark Pate
- Succeeded by: Jeremy Gillam

Personal details
- Born: July 30, 1979 (age 47) Maynard, Arkansas, U.S.
- Party: Republican
- Education: Harding University (BA)
- Website: Official website

Jonathan Dismang (born July 30, 1979) is a former Republican member of the Arkansas Senate. A resident of Beebe in White County near Little Rock, he served in the Arkansas General Assembly from 2011 to 2026. Dismang served as President Pro Tempore of the Arkansas Senate in the 90th Arkansas General Assembly and 91st Arkansas General Assembly.

== Political career ==
He served in the Arkansas House of Representatives before he was elected to the Arkansas Senate in 2010. From 2011 to 2013, he represented Senate District 29, which then included parts of White, Pulaski, and Faulkner counties. Following redistricting in 2013, Dismang represented District 28 until 2023, when he was redistricted into District 18 covering all of White County, along with portions of Cleburne and Faulkner counties.

Dismang serves as the Senate co-chair of the Joint Budget Committee, vice chair of the Transportation, Technology, and Legislative Affairs Committee, a member of the Revenue and Taxation Committee, a member of the Agriculture, Forestry, and Economic Development Committee, a member of the Rules, Resolutions, and Memorials Committee, a member of the Legislative Facilities Committee, a member of the Joint Performance Review, and a member of the Arkansas Legislative Council.

On March 11 2025, Dismang was one of the few Republicans who voted against a nitrogen hypoxia death penalty method bill.

Dismang resigned from the Arkansas House in September 2026 to take a position at the Electric Cooperatives of Arkansas.

== Background ==
Dismang is a graduate of Beebe High School and the Church of Christ-affiliated Harding University in Searcy in White County, receiving degrees in accounting and economics. He is chief financial officer of Whitwell and Ryles Real Estate Investments, LLC, owner of Dismang Consulting Services, LLC, and owns a cattle company. He is married and has two sons.

Arkansas Senate
Preceded by Michael Lamoureux (resigned)	President pro tempore of the Arkansas Senate; 2013–2019	Succeeded by Jim Hendren
