= Sonia Eubanks Barker =

American politician

Member of the Arkansas House of Representatives
- Incumbent
- Assumed office 2017
- Constituency: 7th district (2017–2023); 96th district (2023–present)
- Preceded by: John Blaine (7th) Joshua P. Bryant (96th)

Personal details
- Party: Republican
- Spouse: John
- Children: 3
- Education: Southern Arkansas University
- Profession: Educator; Politician

Sonia Eubanks Barker is an American politician who serves a Republican member of the Arkansas House of Representatives. Having previously represented the 7th district, she currently represents the state's 96th district.

== Biography ==
Barker graduated with honors from Southern Arkansas University. She then proceeded to work as a high school teacher in Smackover.

In 2015, incumbent Democratic state representative John Blaine announced his retirement. Barker announced her candidacy and ran unopposed in the Republican primary. She won the November 2016 general election, after defeating Democrat Floyd Thomas Jr. and independent candidate Glenn Glover. She took office in January 2017.

Barker was re-elected to a second term in the 2018 election. She is currently seeking another term in the 2020 election. She faces Democrat George Calloway Jr.

Barker is married to John and they have three children. They reside in Smackover. Barker is a member of the town's First Baptist Church.
