= LeAnne Burch =

American politician

LeAnna Pittman Burch

Member of the Arkansas House of Representatives from the 9th district
- In office November 2016 – January 2020
- Preceded by: Sheilla Lampkin
- Succeeded by: Howard Beaty

Personal details
- Party: Democratic Party
- Education: Hendrix College; University of Memphis School of Law; The Judge Advocate General's Legal Center and School

Military service
- Branch/service: United States Army
- Years of service: 1986-1998
- Rank: Brigadier General

LeAnne Pittman Burch is a lawyer, politician, and retired brigadier general in Arkansas. She served in the Arkansas House of Representatives from 2016-2020. She was preceded in office by Sheilla Lampkin. Burch served as the House Minority Whip in Ninety-second General Assembly. She was succeeded in office by Howard Beaty. She is a Democrat.

She was born in Stuttgart, Arkansas and graduated from DeWitt High School.

She served in the Active Army for 12 years and in the Army Reserves for 18 years. Her service included tours of duty in Germany, Bosnia, and Afghanistan.

She graduated from Hendrix College, University of Memphis School of Law, and The Judge Advocate General's Legal Center and School.

She currently resides in Monticello, Arkansas. She is Methodist.

== See also ==
- 91st Arkansas General Assembly
- 92nd Arkansas General Assembly
