= Homer Lenderman =

American politician

Homer J. Lenderman, Jr.

Member of the Arkansas House of Representatives from the 53rd district
- In office January 14, 2013 – January 2015
- Preceded by: Keith Ingram
- Succeeded by: Dan Sullivan

Member of the Arkansas House of Representatives from the 76th district
- In office January 2011 – January 14, 2013
- Preceded by: Ray Kidd
- Succeeded by: Denny Altes

Personal details
- Born: August 15, 1956 (age 70) Paragould, Arkansas, US
- Party: Democratic
- Education: Arkansas State University

Homer J. Lenderman, Jr. (born August 15, 1956, in Paragould, Arkansas), is an American politician and a Democratic former member of the Arkansas House of Representatives for District 53 from 2013 to 2015. Lenderman also served from January 2011 until January 2013 in District 76.

== Education ==
Lenderman earned his bachelor's degree and master's degree in agriculture from Arkansas State University in Jonesboro.

== Elections ==
- 2012 Redistricted to District 53, and with Representative Keith Ingram running for Arkansas Senate, Lenderman was unopposed for both the May 22, 2012 Democratic Primary and the November 6, 2012 General election.
- 2010 When District 76 Representative Ray Kidd left the Legislature and left the seat open, Lenderman placed first in the three-way May 18, 2010 Democratic Primary with 1,501 votes (42.6%), won the June 8 runoff election with 1,740 votes (56.2%), and won the November 2, 2010 General election with 3,965 votes (57.6%) against Republican nominee Jim Martin.
