= Bobby Pierce (politician) =

American politician

Member of the Arkansas Senate from the 27th district
- In office January 14, 2013 – January 2017
- Preceded by: Mike Fletcher
- Succeeded by: Trent Garner

Member of the Arkansas House of Representatives from the 19th district
- In office January 2007 – January 14, 2013
- Preceded by: Bob Adams
- Succeeded by: Nate Steel

Personal details
- Party: Democratic

Bobby Joe Pierce is an American politician who served as a member of the Arkansas Senate for the 27th district from 2013 to 2017. Pierce served consecutively in the Arkansas General Assembly from January 2007 until January 2013 in the Arkansas House of Representatives district 19 seat.

== Elections ==
- 2012 With Senate District 27 Senator Mike Fletcher redistricted to District 13, Pierce faced fellow Representative Garry Smith in the May 22, 2012 Democratic Primary, winning with 3,648 votes (52.1%), and won the November 6, 2012 General election with 15,805 votes (50.5%) against Republican nominee Henry Frisby.
- 2006 Initially in House District 19, when Representative Bob Adams left the Legislature and left the seat open, Pierce was unopposed for the 2006 Democratic Primary and won the November 7, 2006 General election against Republican nominee David Workman.
- 2008 Pierce was unopposed for both the May 20, 2008 Democratic Primary and the November 4, 2008 General election.
- 2010 Pierce was unopposed for both the May 18, 2010 Democratic Primary and the November 2, 2010 General election.
