= Charles Armstrong (politician) =

American politician

Member of the Arkansas House of Representatives from the 30th district
- In office January 14, 2013 – January 9, 2017
- Preceded by: Bruce Westerman
- Succeeded by: Fred Allen

Personal details
- Born: North Little Rock, Arkansas, U.S.
- Party: Democratic
- Education: University of Arkansas at Pine Bluff (BS)

Charles L. Armstrong is an American politician and a former Democratic member of the Arkansas House of Representatives, having represented District 30 in the capital city of Little Rock from 2013 to 2017.

== Education ==
Armstrong earned his BS in Biology and Chemistry from the University of Arkansas at Pine Bluff.

== Elections ==
- 2012 – Redistricted to District 30, with District 33 Representative Fred Allen running for Arkansas Senate and District 30 incumbent Republican Representative Bruce Westerman redistricted to District 22, Armstrong placed first in the three-way May 22, 2012 Democratic Primary with 964 votes (58.4%), won the June 22 runoff election with 321 votes (57.8%), and was unopposed for the November 6, 2012 General election.
- 2000 – When the District 56 seat was left open, Armstrong ran in the three-way 2000 Democratic primary but lost to Joyce Elliott, who went on to win the November 7, 2000 General election.
- 2006 – Redistricted to District 33, when Representative Elliott ran for Arkansas Senate and left the seat open, Armstrong ran in the four-way 2006 Democratic Primary but lost to Fred Allen, who was unopposed for the November 7, 2006 General election.

Armstrong is the vice-chairman in 2015 of the Arkansas Legislative Black Caucus, with State Senator Linda Chesterfield, also of Little Rock, as the president.
