= Mathew Pitsch =

American politician

Mat Pitsch

Member of the Arkansas Senate from the 8th district
- In office January 14, 2019 – January 9, 2023
- Preceded by: Frank Glidewell
- Succeeded by: Stephanie Flowers

Majority Leader of the Arkansas House of Representatives
- In office January 9, 2017 – March 26, 2018
- Preceded by: Ken Bragg
- Succeeded by: Marcus Richmond

Member of the Arkansas House of Representatives from the 76th district
- In office January 2015 – January 14, 2019
- Preceded by: Denny Altes
- Succeeded by: Cindy Crawford

Personal details
- Born: 1963 or 1964 (age 62–63) Buffalo, Wyoming, U.S.
- Party: Republican
- Spouse: Seanna
- Children: 4
- Education: Missouri University of Science and Technology (BS, MS)

Mathew W. "Mat" Pitsch (born 1963 or 1964) is an American politician who most recently served as a member of the Arkansas Senate from the 8th district. Elected in November 2018, he was in office from January 14, 2019 to January 9, 2023. Pitsch was a member of the Arkansas House of Representatives from 2015 to 2019.

== Early life and education ==
Pitsch was born in Buffalo, Wyoming and raised in Fort Smith, Arkansas. He earned Bachelor of Science and Master of Science degrees in engineering management from the Missouri University of Science and Technology. The university honored Pitsch in 2005, including him among the first inductees into its Academy of Engineering Management.

== Career ==
Prior to entering politics, Pitsch worked as the executive director of Western Arkansas Intermodal Authority and dean of the College of Applied Science and Technology at the University of Arkansas–Fort Smith. He was elected to the Arkansas Senate in November 2018 and assumed office on January 14, 2019.

In February 2021, Pitsch declared his candidacy for treasurer of Arkansas in the 2022 election. He was endorsed by incumbent treasurer Dennis Milligan. In the Republican primary, Pitsch lost the nomination nearly 3:1 to Arkansas House representative Mark Lowery.

By June 2023, Pitsch became the director of government affairs for the secretary of state's office.

Arkansas House of Representatives
Preceded by Ken Bragg	Majority Leader of the Arkansas House of Representatives; 2017–2018	Succeeded by Marcus Richmond
