= Stephanie Flowers =

American politician (born 1953)

Stephanie Anne Flowers

Member of the Arkansas Senate from the 8th district
- Incumbent
- Assumed office January 9, 2023
- Preceded by: Mathew Pitsch

Member of the Arkansas Senate from the 25th district
- In office January 14, 2013 – January 9, 2023
- Preceded by: Gene Jeffress
- Succeeded by: Breanne Davis

Member of the Arkansas Senate from the 5th district
- In office January 2011 – January 14, 2013
- Preceded by: Hank Wilkins
- Succeeded by: Bryan King

Member of the Arkansas House of Representatives from the 17th district
- In office January 2005 – January 2011
- Preceded by: Calvin Johnson
- Succeeded by: Hank Wilkins

Personal details
- Born: August 8, 1953 (age 73) Pine Bluff, Arkansas, U.S.
- Party: Democratic
- Education: Philander Smith College; Thurgood Marshall School of Law
- Profession: Attorney

Stephanie Anne Flowers (born August 8, 1953) is an American attorney and Democratic politician, serving in public office since 2004. Flowers started in politics when she was elected in 2004 to the District 17 seat in the Arkansas House of Representatives. In 2011, she was elected to the Arkansas State Senate where she remains presently.

Flowers graduated from Philander Smith College in Little Rock and the Thurgood Marshall School of Law, then known as Texas Southern University School of Law, in Houston, Texas. She became active in politics after returning to Pine Bluff, Arkansas, where she joined the Democratic Party and established a private law practice.

== Elections ==
- 2004 Initially in State House District 17; Flowers won the 2004 Democratic primary and ran unopposed for the November 2, 2004 general election.
- 2006 Flowers was unopposed for both the 2006 Democratic primary and the November 7 general election.
- 2008 Flowers was unopposed for both the May 20, 2008 primary and the November 4 general election.
- 2010 With District 5 Senator Hank Wilkins running for the House District 17 seat, Flowers ran for the open District 5 State Senate seat, won the May 18, 2010 Democratic primary with 4,798 votes (56.2 percent) and was unopposed for the November 2, 2010 general election.
- 2012 Redistricted to District 25. Following the retirement of state Senator Percy Malone, Flowers won the May 22, 2012 Democratic primary with 4,718 votes (58.5 percent) against fellow state Representative Efrem Elliott. She swept the November 6, 2012 general election with 19,955 votes (82.8 percent) against Libertarian candidate David Dinwiddie.

== Family ==
Stephanie Flowers was born to Margaret Brown Flowers, an educator, and William Harold Flowers, a notable attorney who pioneered desegregation of the University of Arkansas School of Law at Fayetteville, AR.

Her relative, Vivian Flowers, serves in the Arkansas House of Representatives for the 65th district and previously District 17.

== Early career ==
After graduating from Thurgood Marshall School of Law, Flowers returned to Pine Bluff, Arkansas, where she entered into private practice. Flowers served as a deputy prosecutor for the juvenile court in Jefferson County, Arkansas and has been a practicing lawyer for over 30 years.

== Senator Flowers ==
=== Committee memberships ===
Stephanie Flowers serves as Vice Chair on the Arkansas Senate Judiciary Committee and on the Joint Budget Claims Committee. Flowers also serves as a member on the following committees: Arkansas Legislative Council, Joint Budget Committee, City, County & Local Affairs Senate Committee, Joint Energy Committee, Children and Youth Senate Committee, and the Arkansas Legislative Black Caucus.

=== Policy ===
==== Gun control and Senate Bill 484 (2019) ====
Flowers went viral in early 2019 when she made passionate remarks about debate on Senate Bill 484, which removed the "duty to retreat" portion of the Stand Your Ground law being presented before the Senate Judiciary Committee. As discussion before the Committee about the bill surpassed two hours, there was a motion to limit commentary to 10 minutes per person. As the only black member of the committee, Flowers defended the right of citizens to debate the bill, remarking that people like her son don't "walk the same path." Coverage of the remarks especially focused on Flowers's response to Senator Alan Clark after he cautioned her to stop yelling: "What the hell you going to do, shoot me?"
