= John Baine (politician) =

American politician

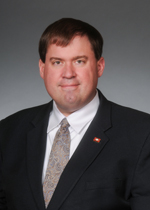

Member of the Arkansas House of Representatives from the 7th district
- In office January 2013 – December 2016
- Preceded by: Garry Smith
- Succeeded by: Sonia Eubanks Barker

Personal details
- Born: El Dorado, Arkansas
- Party: Democratic
- Education: University of Mississippi; Arkansas State University; Louisiana Tech University
- Profession: Accountant

John Baine (born in El Dorado, Arkansas) is an American politician and a Democratic member of the Arkansas House of Representatives representing District 7 from January 2013 to December 2016. He is a member of the NRA.

== Education ==
Baine earned his bachelor's degree in public administration from the University of Mississippi, his BS in accounting and his MPA from Arkansas State University, and his Master of Accountancy from Louisiana Tech University.

== Elections ==
In 2012 District 7 Representative Garry Smith ran for Arkansas Senate and left the seat open. Baine placed first in the three-way May 22, 2012 Democratic Primary with 790 votes (44.5%), won the June 22 runoff election with 536 votes (59.8%), and was unopposed for the November 6, 2012 General election. He did not seek re-election in 2016.

He earlier served as a Union County, Arkansas Justice of the Peace representing District 2 from 2001 to 2012.

== Ashley Madison Leak ==
In 2015 the website Ashley Madison, which caters to married people seeking to have an affair, was hacked and the names of its clientele released. John Baine was revealed as one of the website's clients, and the same week announced that he would not seek re-election. He denied any connection between these events.
