= Nelda Speaks =

American politician

Member of the Arkansas House of Representatives from the 100th district
- In office January 12, 2015 – 8 January 2022

Personal details
- Party: Republican
- Education: Daymar College

Nelda Speaks is an American politician who formerly served in the Arkansas House of Representatives in the 100th district. She did not desire to seek re-election in 2022, retiring from public service.
