= Eddie Joe Williams =

American politician (born 1954)

Member of the Arkansas Senate from the 29th district
- In office January 10, 2011 – November 15, 2017
- Preceded by: Bobby Glover
- Succeeded by: Ricky Hill

Majority Leader of the Arkansas Senate
- In office 2013–2015
- Succeeded by: Jim Hendren

Mayor of Cabot, Arkansas
- In office January 1, 2007 – January 1, 2011
- Preceded by: Mickey Stumbaugh
- Succeeded by: Bill Cypert

Personal details
- Born: June 26, 1954 (age 72) Sheridan, Arkansas, U.S.
- Party: Republican
- Spouse: DeLona Ruby
- Children: 4

Military service
- Allegiance: United States
- Branch/service: United States Army
- Years of service: 1972

Eddie Joe Williams (born June 26, 1954) is an American politician who served as a member of the Arkansas Senate for the 29th district from 2011 to 2017. During his tenure in the Senate, Williams served as majority leader.

== Early life ==
Williams was born in Sheridan, Arkansas. He graduated from Sheridan High School in 1972.

== Career ==
Williams served in the United States Army and worked for the Union Pacific Railroad for thirty years. He served on the Cabot Planning Commission and the Cabot City Council before he was elected three times as mayor. He faced a $500,000 deficit when he became mayor of Cabot, Arkansas.

Williams is a member of the American Legislative Exchange Council (ALEC), a conservative non-partisan, non-profit legislative association. He and Arkansas State Auditor Andrea Lea, served at one time as the state co-chairs of the organization. On October 26, 2017, President Donald Trump appointed Williams as his federal representative to the Southern States Energy Board. Since leaving the Senate, Williams has served as senior legislative liaison to Governor Asa Hutchinson.

In September 2021, Williams declared his candidacy for secretary of state of Arkansas in the 2022 election. In an interview following his candidacy, Williams claimed that he wasn't sure if Biden won the 2020 presidential election, and gave credence to false allegations of voter fraud by claiming that full investigations into voter fraud in swing states might have tilted the election for Biden.

== Personal life ==
Williams and his wife, DeLona, have four daughters and seven grandchildren.
