= Larry Teague =

American politician

Member of the Arkansas Senate from the 10th district
- In office January 14, 2013 – January 9th 2023
- Preceded by: Missy Irvin
- Succeeded by: Ron Caldwell

Member of the Arkansas Senate from the 20th district
- In office January 2009 – January 14, 2013
- Preceded by: Jim Hill
- Succeeded by: Robert F. Thompson

Member of the Arkansas House of Representatives from the 19th district
- In office January 1997 – January 2003
- Succeeded by: Bob Adams

Personal details
- Born: Nashville, Arkansas
- Party: Democratic
- Spouse: Debbie Teague
- Children: 2
- Education: Texarkana College; University of Arkansas
- Profession: Insurance
- Website: senate.arkansas.gov/senators/larry-teague

Larry R. Teague (from Nashville, Arkansas) is a former American politician and was a Democratic member of the Arkansas Senate representing District 10, which includes Howard, Montgomery, Pike, and Polk counties and parts of Clark, Hempstead, Nevada, and Sevier counties. He also served as Senate Minority Whip. He was ineligible to seek re-election in 2022 due to term limits. Teague served consecutively in the Arkansas General Assembly from January 2009 until January 2013 in the Senate District 20 seat and from January 1997 through January 2002 in the Arkansas House of Representatives District 19 seat.

== Personal life ==
Teague attended Texarkana College and the University of Arkansas. He owns an insurance agency in Nashville and was previously assistant manager of the Skaggs Alpha Beta grocery store in Texarkana. He is also active in the Arkansas Hunger Relief Alliance and attends the First United Methodist Church of Nashville, where he serves as a lay speaker and Sunday school teacher.

== Political positions ==
Senator Teague could be considered a conservative Democrat, voting against the party line on various issues.

The American Conservative Union gave him a lifetime score of 49.33%, indicating a centrist position. In 2019, he received a B+ grade from the Family Council Action Committee, indicating a conservative stance, especially on social issues like abortion, education, and marijuana. That same year, Conduit for Commerce gave Teague a score of 59.6%, indicating a somewhat fiscally conservative stance.

In 2015, progressive group Arkansas Citizens First Congress gave him a score of 59%, indicating a liberal stance. They gave him a score of 33% on civil rights, 17% on economic issues, 75% on education, 100% on election and government reform, 50% on environmental issues, and 100% on public health.

In 2021, Young Democrats of Arkansas, a progressive organization, released a statement condemning Senator Teague's votes on various bills. The next day, a resolution to the same effect was debated at that month's Democratic Party of Arkansas meeting.

=== Abortion ===
Despite being a member of the Democratic Party, Teague has consistently voted in favor of anti-abortion legislation, including a full abortion ban "except to save the life of a pregnant woman in a medical emergency." Planned Parenthood Voters of Arkansas gave him a score of 0% in 2015.

=== Guns ===
Teague was the only Democrat to vote in favor of Arkansas' stand-your-ground law, which removed the state's duty to retreat provision. He has been consistently endorsed by the NRA Political Victory Fund.

=== LGBT ===
Teague was the only Democrat to vote in favor of the 'SAFE Act', which banned sex reassignment surgery, hormone replacement therapy, and puberty blockers for transgender youth, but he voted against overriding Governor Asa Hutchinson's veto. He was also one of only two Democrats who voted in favor of the 'Fairness in Women's Sports Act', which banned transgender athletes from competing in women's sports. Representative Denise Garner later clarified that she did not intend to vote for the bill and pressed the wrong button by mistake, making Teague the only Democrat who intentionally voted in favor.

=== Labor unions ===
In 2018, Senator Teague was endorsed by United Auto Workers.

== Committees ==
Larry Teague served on the following legislative committees:

- Insurance & Commerce - Senate (vice-chair)
- ALC-JBC Personnel
- JBC-Personnel
- ALC-Peer
- Committee of the Whole - Senate
- Arkansas Legislative Arts and Technology Boot Camp
- Joint Budget Committee - Pre-Fiscal Session Budget Hearings
- JBC-Administrative Rule Review Subcommittee
- Arkansas Legislative Council
- ALC-Review
- Public Retirement & Social Security Programs - Joint
- Revenue and Tax - Senate
- Legislative Joint Auditing
- Senate Efficiency
- Joint Budget Committee

== Elections ==
- Teague formerly served as an alderman for the City of Nashville
- In 1996, Teague was initially elected to House District 19 after winning the Democratic Primary with over 71% of the vote and the November 5th General election unopposed
- Teague was re-elected in 1998, unopposed in both the primary and general election
- In 2000, Teague was unopposed for both the 2000 Democratic Primary and the November 2000 General election
- In 2008, when District 20 Senator Jim Hill left the Legislature and left the seat open, Teague won the May 20, 2008 Democratic Primary with 5,496 votes (56.7%) and was unopposed for the November 4, 2008 General election.
- In 2012, Senator Teague was redistricted to District 10, with Senator Missy Irvin redistricted to District 18. Teague was unopposed for both the May 22, 2012 Democratic Primary and the November 6, 2012 General election.
- In 2018, Teague was challenged in the general election by Libertarian Bobbi Hicks and won re-election with 62.41% of the vote
2018 Arkansas Senate District 10 election. Blue denotes a Teague victory, yellow denotes a Hicks victory, and purple denotes a tie.

By county

By precinct
