= Ken Bragg =

American politician

Kenneth Wayne "Ken" Bragg

Member of the Arkansas House of Representatives from the 15th district
- In office January 2013 – January 2023

Majority Leader of the Arkansas House of Representatives
- In office 2015–2017
- Preceded by: Bruce Westerman
- Succeeded by: Mathew Pitsch

Personal details
- Born: August 7, 1950 (age 76) Port Arthur, Texas
- Party: Republican
- Spouse: Beverly J. Bragg
- Children: 2
- Education: Stephen F. Austin State University
- Occupation: Forester, politician

Kenneth Wayne Bragg (born August 7, 1950) is an American politician in Arkansas. He served from January 2013 to January 2023 as a Republican member of the Arkansas House of Representatives for District 15 in Grant County, a traditional Democratic stronghold. In 2015, his colleagues named him the House Majority Leader, a position he held for two years.

Bragg is a former member of the city council in Sheridan. He is Southern Baptist.

Bragg is the son of the former Eula Mae Harrington and Lawrence C. Bragg, a sergeant in World War II; the couple lived in Port Arthur, Texas. In 1972, Bragg received a Bachelor of Science degree in forestry from Stephen F. Austin State University in Nacogdoches, Texas. Since that time he has been employed in the forestry industry, including a 25-year commitment to International Paper Company. In 2006, he joined Resource Management Service, in which capacity he oversees forest management activities on 300,000 acres (120,000 ha) in Arkansas. He is a member of the executive committee of the Arkansas Forestry Association.

In 2013, the Arkansas Timber Producers Association named Bragg "Legislator of the Year" for his sponsorship of legislation to eliminate the sales tax on forestry equipment, a move which the association contends will make the timber industry more competitive with its counterparts in surrounding states. His Facebook page shows his political views as conservative.

Bragg and his wife, Beverly J. Bragg, originally from Port Arthur, Texas, have a son, Aaron Christopher Bragg (born 1977), a Certified Public Accountant in Little Rock, who in 2013 wed the assistant U.S. attorney Allison Courtney Waldrip. The Braggs also have a daughter.
