= Micah Neal =

American politician (born 1974)

Micah Scott Neal

Member of the Arkansas House of Representatives from the 89th district
- In office 2013–2017
- Preceded by: Charlie Collins
- Succeeded by: Jeff Williams

Personal details
- Born: November 8, 1974 (age 51) Washington County, Arkansas, USA
- Party: Republican
- Spouse: Cindy Neal
- Children: 3
- Education: Fayetteville Christian School; University of Arkansas
- Occupation: Businessman

Micah Scott Neal (born November 8, 1974) is a businessman and politician. Neal represented part of Springdale in the Arkansas House of Representatives from 2013 until 2017. From 2003 to 2011, he was a justice of the peace on the Washington County quorum court. He pleaded guilty in 2017 to fraud relating to misuse of the state's surplus money.

== Bribery ==
On January 4, 2017, Neal pled guilty to conspiring to direct $600,000 in state government funds to Ecclesia College and another non-profit organization in exchange for $38,000 in bribes. He was found guilty and sentenced to one year of home confinement, two years probation, 300 hours of community service and restitution of $200,000.

The plea agreement also singled out the president of the college—Oren Paris III—for direct involvement with the conspiracy. Paris stated that "neither I nor anyone associated with Ecclesia College has ever participated or engaged in any activity to provide money to Mr. Neal or any other legislator in exchange for the receipt of those funds."

Also indicted in the case is former state Senator Jon Woods of Springdale and Randell Shelton, Jr., of Alma in Crawford County, Arkansas.

Preceded by Charlie Collins (moved to District 84 by redistricting)	Arkansas State Representative for District 89 (Washington County); 2013–2017	Succeeded by Jeff Williams
