= David Whitaker (politician) =

American politician

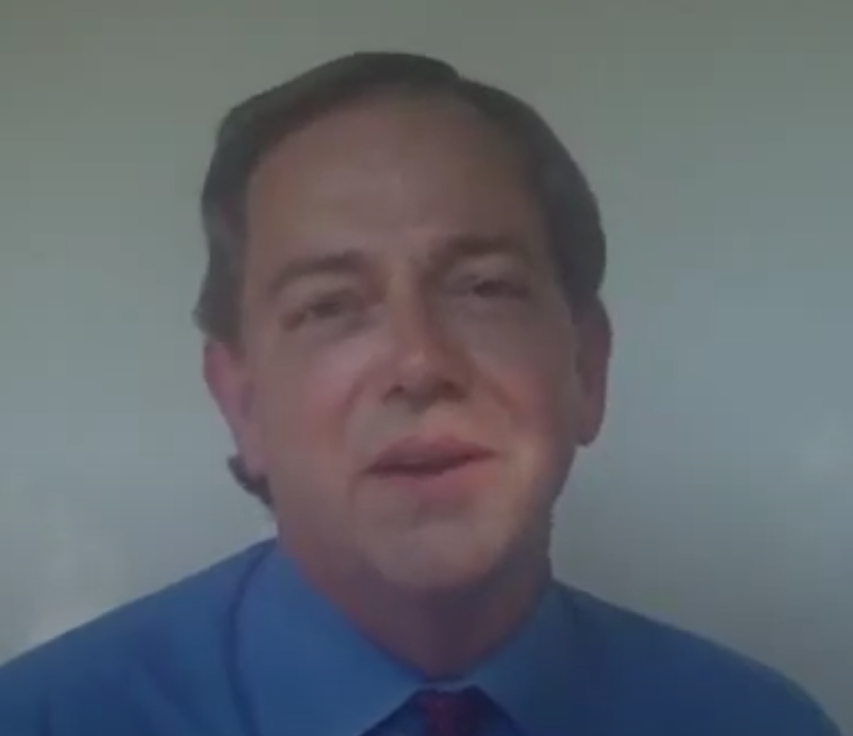

Minority Leader of the Arkansas House of Representatives
- In office January 9, 2017 – January 14, 2019
- Preceded by: Eddie Armstrong
- Succeeded by: Charles Blake

Member of the Arkansas House of Representatives from the 85th district
- Incumbent
- Assumed office January 14, 2013
- Preceded by: John Burris (Redistricted)

Personal details
- Born: David Jeffrey Whitaker; April 8, 1961 (age 65)
- Party: Democratic
- Spouse: Lisa Raney
- Education: University of Mary Washington (BS); University of Arkansas, Fayetteville (JD)
- Website: Campaign website

Military service
- Allegiance: United States
- Branch/service: United States Air Force
- Years of service: 1983–1989
- Rank: Staff Sergeant

David Jeffrey Whitaker (born April 8, 1961) is an American attorney and politician serving as a member of the Arkansas House of Representatives for the 85th district. Whitaker was a candidate for Arkansas's 3rd congressional district in the 2010 election.

== Early life and education ==
Raised in Georgia, Whitaker graduated from Granby High School in Norfolk, Virginia. Whitaker earned a Bachelor of Arts degree in geography from University of Mary Washington and a Juris Doctor from the University of Arkansas School of Law.

== Career ==
He served in the United States Air Force from 1983 to 1989 reaching the rank of staff sergeant. While in the Air Force he served aboard the USNS Observation Island (T-AGM-23).

In 1992 he was an editorial research intern with the book division of the National Geographic Society in Washington, D.C.

During law school, he clerked for the Washington County prosecuting attorney and served on his law school's honor council. From 1999 to 2000 he served on the Washington County Domestic Violence Task Force. From 2001 to 2009 he served as an assistant city attorney for Fayetteville, Arkansas. From 2007 to 2009 he served as the chairman of the Washington County Democratic Party.

From 2011 to 2013 he was a member of the adjunct faculty at Northwest Arkansas Community College.

In 2013 he was elected to the Arkansas House of Representatives to represent the 85th District defeating Paul Graham.

== Personal life ==
He resides in Fayetteville, Arkansas with his wife, Lisa and their two daughters.

== Elections ==
- 2012 With District 85 incumbent Representative John Burris redistricted to District 98, Whitaker won the May 22, 2012 Democratic Primary with 1,264 votes (74.1%), and won the November 6, 2012 General election with 6,450 votes (56.0%) against Republican nominee Paul Graham.
- 2010 When Arkansas's 3rd Congressional District Representative John Boozman ran for United States Senate, Whitaker was unopposed for the May 18, 2010 Democratic Primary but lost the November 2, 2010 General election Republican nominee Steve Womack.

Year	Office	District	Democratic		Republican	
2010	U.S. House of Representatives	Arkansas's 3rd district	David Whitaker	27.56%	Steve Womack	72.44%
2012	Arkansas House of Representatives	House District 85	David Whitaker	56%	Paul Graham	44%
2014	Arkansas House of Representatives	House District 85	David Whitaker	100%	Unopposed	
2016	Arkansas House of Representatives	House District 85	David Whitaker	52.94%	Dwight Gonzalez	47.06%
2018	Arkansas House of Representatives	House District 85	David Whitaker	100%	Unopposed	
2020	Arkansas House of Representatives	House District 85	David Whitaker	55.3%	Brian Hester	44.7%
2022	Arkansas House of Representatives	House District 85	David Whitaker	52.5%%	Brian Hester	47.5%

Arkansas House of Representatives
Preceded by Eddie Armstrong	Minority Leader of the Arkansas House of Representatives; 2017–2019	Succeeded by Charles Blake
