= Dan Douglas =

American politician

Member of the Arkansas House of Representatives from the 91st district
- In office January 14, 2013 – January 11, 2021
- Preceded by: Bryan King
- Succeeded by: Delia Haak

Personal details
- Born: Dan Marshall Douglas
- Party: Republican

Dan Marshall Douglas is an American politician. A member of the Republican Party, he served in the Arkansas House of Representatives from 2013 to 2021.
