= Jeremy Gillam =

American farmer and politician

Speaker of the Arkansas House of Representatives
- In office January 2015 – June 15, 2018
- Preceded by: Davy Carter
- Succeeded by: Matthew Shepherd

Member of the Arkansas House of Representatives from the 45th district
- In office January 2013 – June 15, 2018
- Preceded by: Linda Tyler
- Succeeded by: Jim Wooten

Member of the Arkansas House of Representatives from the 49th district
- In office January 2011 – January 2013
- Preceded by: Jonathan Dismang
- Succeeded by: Marshall Wright

Personal details
- Born: August 2, 1976 (age 49)
- Party: Republican
- Education: Arkansas State University (BA)

Jeremy Gillam (born August 2, 1976) is an American politician and lobbyist. A Republican, he was a member of the Arkansas House of Representatives before resigning to work for the University of Central Arkansas. He serves as the university's Director of Governmental Affairs and External Relations. He represented District 45. He has a bachelor's degree from Arkansas State University.

He served in the Arkansas House from 2011 to 2017. He is a Baptist. He left office to work as a lobbyist for the University of Arkansas in 2018.

Political offices
Preceded by Davy Carter	Speaker of the Arkansas House of Representatives; 2015–2018	Succeeded by Matthew Shepherd
