= Jon Woods =

American politician and musician

Jonathan Earl Woods
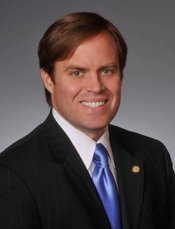
- Woods in 2013

Member of the Arkansas Senate from the 7th district
- In office January 14, 2013 – January 9, 2017
- Preceded by: Bill Pritchard
- Succeeded by: Lance Eads

Member of the Arkansas House of Representatives from the 93rd district
- In office January 8, 2007 – January 14, 2013
- Preceded by: Doug Matayo
- Succeeded by: Jim Dotson

Personal details
- Born: August 23, 1977 (age 49) Charlotte, North Carolina, U.S.
- Party: Republican
- Education: University of Arkansas; Northwest Arkansas Community College
- Occupation: Musician, banker, legislator
- Website: Legislative bio

Jonathan Earl Woods (born August 23, 1977), also known as Jon Woods, is an American former politician and musician. He served as a Republican member of both chambers of the Arkansas General Assembly, representing the 93rd district in the Arkansas House of Representatives (2007–2013) and the 7th district in the Arkansas Senate (2013–2017).

In May 2018, Woods was convicted on multiple federal counts, including honest-services mail and wire fraud, and money laundering. On September 6, 2018, he was sentenced to 220 months in federal prison and ordered to pay $1.6 million in restitution.

== Early life and education ==
Woods was born in Charlotte, North Carolina, on August 23, 1977. In 1979, he and his family moved to Blytheville, Arkansas, in Mississippi County, Arkansas. He attended public schools in Gosnell, Arkansas through the ninth grade.

In 1993, Woods relocated with his family to Siloam Springs, Arkansas, where he achieved the rank of Eagle Scout and participated in Arkansas Boys State.

Woods graduated in 1996 and attended Northwest Arkansas Community College in Bentonville, where he earned an Associate of Arts and an Associate of Science in Business. He later transferred to the University of Arkansas, where he earned a bachelor's degree in marketing management from the Sam M. Walton College of Business in 2002. While at the university, he served in the Associated Student Government Senate, chaired the College Republicans, and interned at the Arkansas Small Business and Technology Development Center. He was also a member of Pi Kappa Alpha and participated in intramural sports.

Upon graduation, Woods served as a loan officer for a local bank. In 2006 he was selected by the NWA Business Journal's "40 under 40".

== Music career ==
Growing up in the Arkansas Delta, Woods and his brother, Dustin, were influenced by the nearby Memphis, Tennessee music scene, including events on Mud Island during the 1980s and early 1990s. After the family relocated to Siloam Springs, Arkansas in 1993, Dustin began playing guitar and formed two high‑school bands that performed at talent shows. Although Jon Woods had an interest in music, his focus in high school was primarily on politics and sports.

In 2004, Jon and Dustin Woods, along with Sean Marriott, formed the pop‑rock band A Good Fight. The band’s name was inspired by II Timothy 4:7 and served as a tribute to a deceased friend of Jon Woods. In 2006, after multiple auditions, the group selected Eddie Love as lead vocalist. The band released two albums: The City Could Be Ours by Morning (2008) and A Good Fight (2010). Their songs were featured on MTV programming and in the video game MLB 13: The Show. The band also performed at music festivals, including the SXSW Music Festival in Austin, Texas.

While serving in the legislature in 2009, Woods supported HB1837 (Act 497), which designated a portion of Highway 67 in northeastern Arkansas as “Rock ’n’ Roll Highway.” The legislation was intended to honor the region’s musical heritage and promote tourism and economic development. Artists associated with the highway include Elvis Presley, Johnny Cash, Jerry Lee Lewis, and Carl Perkins.

Woods also proposed relocating the Arkansas Entertainers Hall of Fame from the Pine Bluff Convention Center to the River Market District in Little Rock to increase public exposure. The Hall of Fame houses memorabilia from Arkansas musicians and other entertainers.

In 2011, Woods produced the debut album by The Plaid Jackets, The New Adventures of the Plaid Jackets, Vol. 1, which included the track “Adam West Is Batman.” The song was later featured in the documentary Starring Adam West.

== Political career ==
Woods served in the Arkansas House of Representatives from 2007 to 2013 and in the Arkansas Senate from 2013 to 2017. He is credited with sponsoring more than 100 bills that became law and with helping to establish task forces and commissions. After reaching term limits in the House, he ran for the Arkansas Senate in District 7, which includes most of Springdale, Tontitown, Goshen, Elkins, Durham, parts of Fayetteville, and eastern Washington County. Woods was recognized by the American Red Cross with a Hero Award at the "Celebration of Heroes Event" on Saturday, May 2, 2015, for performing CPR on a visitor at the Arkansas State Capitol.

Arkansas House of Representatives (2007-2013)

86th General Assembly (2007-2009)

Woods supported legislation to establish Arkansas’s first umbilical cord blood bank to collect stem cells for research. He received the “Invest in Life” award alongside Senator Johnny Key for work on this project.

87th General Assembly (2009-2011)

Woods served as chair of the Advanced Communications and Information Technology Committee during this session. In November 2010, Woods was the House lead sponsor of Issue 1, which established a constitutional right to hunt, fish, trap, and harvest wildlife within the state. Arkansas voters approved the measure with 82.78% of the vote.

88th General Assembly (2011-2013)

Woods sponsored legislation to increase penalties for sex crimes, enhance public notification for offenders, and implement electronic health records through the Office of Health Information Technology. He also co‑sponsored legislation to establish a state sales‑tax holiday on school supplies.

Arkansas Senate (2013-2017)

89th General Assembly (2013-2015)

As a state senator, Woods served on committees including Insurance and Commerce, Judiciary, and the Arkansas Legislative Council. He sponsored Carter’s Law, promoting education about shaken baby syndrome.

Woods was the lead sponsor of Issue 3, which according to Ballotpedia, is widely considered one of the most comprehensive ethics and campaign finance laws passed by Arkansas voters in 2014. 53% of Arkansas voters approved Issue 3, “the Elected Officials Ethics, Transparency and Financial Reform Amendment”. The measure banned lobbyist gifts to legislators, added a two-year lobbying “cooling-off” period, limited campaign contributions, restructured term limits and created an independent salary commission, prohibiting lawmakers from voting on their own salaries.

90th General Assembly (2015-2017)

Woods was the Senate lead sponsor of the Arkansas Removal of Cap on State-Issued Bonds Amendment, also known as Issue 3. It was on the Nov. 8, 2016 ballot in Arkansas as a legislatively referred constitutional amendment.

Issue 3 proposed to remove the cap on the amount of bonds the state is allowed to issue to a corporation, association, institution, or individual to help finance economic development projects and services. This proposal passed by a 65% margin.

== Political Positions ==
On March 1, 2016, Woods publicly endorsed Donald Trump in the 2016 Republican presidential primary; at the time, many other Arkansas lawmakers held a press conference to endorse Marco Rubio instead. According to the Arkansas Democrat-Gazette, out of 101 elected Republican legislators, constitutional officers, and members of Congress in Arkansas, Woods was the only one to publicly endorse Trump in the 2016 primary.

Marco Rubio’s Arkansas state chairman, State Sen. Bart Hester (R–Cave Springs), said at the time, “I can’t sit here and say I’m willing to vote for Donald Trump at this time. He just doesn’t share the values that I share.”

On March 1, 2016, Woods stated:

“I support Donald Trump for the 2016 Republican Presidential bid of the United States of America. Donald Trump is a Christian Conservative who is strongly pro-life, understands the importance of the 2nd amendment, supports a limited government, is anti new taxes and loves his family and country deeply. I believe Donald Trump’s leadership as President of the United States will Make America Great Again.”

== Complaint and Investigation ==
Dismissed Complaint

In February 2016, Jeff Oland of Farmington, Arkansas, filed an ethics complaint with the Arkansas Ethics Commission alleging that Woods coordinated campaign mailers in his 2012 election with Conservative Arkansas PAC. After reviewing evidence and conducting interviews, the commission dismissed the complaint in May 2016.

Federal Indictment and Trial

On March 1, 2017, a federal grand jury indicted Woods, Oren Paris III ( Ecclesia College), and Randell Shelton Jr., alleging a scheme to steer General Improvement Fund (GIF) grants to favored recipients in exchange for kickbacks; Woods denied the charges through counsel. In a related matter, Representative Micah Neal pleaded guilty to one count of conspiracy to commit honest‑services fraud arising from GIF grants.

Trial Scheduling

Woods’s jury trial was initially set for May 8, 2017, then continued to December 8, 2017, and later to April 9, 2018, to accommodate two superseding indictments (April 18 and September 13, 2017), additional discovery, dismissal hearing, and pretrial motions.

FBI Computer Wipe

FBI Special Agent Robert Cessario was the lead investigator in the case against former State Senator Jon Woods. The core of the evidence involved 140 hours of secret audio recordings capturing conversations about the “kickback scheme” gathered during the investigation. Defense attorneys realized that they had not received all of the audio recordings gathered during the investigation period. Gaps in the files were brought to light during a pretrial hearing.

November 30, 2017, Cessario was court ordered by a federal judge to surrender his laptop to computer experts at the FBI’s Little Rock headquarters for a forensic examination.

December 4, 2017, Cessario took the device to a commercial computer shop to have it professionally wiped, before he turned over his laptop.

December 7, 2017, Cessario personally ran an erasure procedure on the hard drive for the second time.

January 22, 2018, Cessario was interviewed by Chloe Pearce, Senior Special Agent with the United States Department of Justice, Office of the Inspector General with the Dallas Field Office.

Agent Cessario resigned shortly after the interview was conducted.

January 25 and 26, 2018, a dismissal hearing of the charges against former Senator Jon Woods was held. The dismissal hearing was due to an FBI computer examiner who had discovered the hard drive was completely blank. Cessario called the examiner and asked him to lie to superiors by reporting that “there was nothing on the drive.” The examiner refused and reported the incident.

March 20, 2018, the presiding judge, Timothy Brooks, ultimately denied the motion to dismiss which allowed the case to proceed to trial.

Micah Neal Law Firm Hard Drive

At the same hearings, questions arose about obtaining “pristine” copies from the law office of Neal’s attorney, Shane Wilkinson, after a computer crash; the government reported that a backup at a local vendor yielded one additional audio file, bringing the total to 119 recordings provided to the parties.

Conviction and Sentence

On May 3, 2018, after a multi‑week trial and two days of deliberation, a jury convicted Woods of conspiracy to commit mail fraud, twelve counts of wire fraud, and money laundering; on September 6, 2018, he was sentenced to 220 months in prison and ordered to pay $1.6 million in restitution, below the guidelines range.

== Appeal to the Eighth Circuit ==
Following sentencing in 2018, Woods filed a notice of appeal to the United States Court of Appeals for the Eighth Circuit.

On October 16, 2020, the Eighth Circuit affirmed the judgment, holding that dismissal was not required notwithstanding an FBI agent’s misconduct because the destroyed material lacked apparent exculpatory value and the information was otherwise available (citing the panel’s earlier reasoning in a related appeal).

In April 2022, Woods sought a new trial based on purported newly discovered evidence. On August 31, 2022, the Eighth Circuit unanimously denied relief, concluding that “the purportedly newly discovered evidence buttressed rather than rebutted the case against Woods and was immaterial or previously available.”

== National Association of Criminal Defense Lawyers (NACDL) ==
The National Association of Criminal Defense Lawyers (NACDL) is a U.S. professional organization that advocates for justice and due process for individuals accused of crimes or other misconduct.

In connection with the appeals arising from the Ecclesia College case, NACDL filed an amicus curiae brief in the Eighth Circuit urging reversal based on due process concerns related to destruction of evidence. The brief contended that intentional “wiping” of a government‑issued laptop used in the investigation warranted a remedy sufficient to protect the defendant’s right to examine potentially exculpatory evidence and to deter similar misconduct.

“This case involves an important question of criminal law: Under the Due Process Clause of the United States Constitution, what is the appropriate remedy when a government agent acts in shocking bad faith, intentionally ‘wiping’ his government‑issued, undercover laptop computer instead of delivering it for a forensic evaluation as instructed by the judge? … The remedy given by the Court wasn’t nearly sufficient to (a) satisfy the defendant’s right to seek and discover potentially exculpatory evidence; (b) punish the government for wrongful conduct in this case; or (c) deter wrongful conduct in future cases by similarly situated government agents or entities. … This Court should reverse the decision of the District Court, and remand this case with instructions to dismiss the indictment.”

== FBI Agent Pleads Guilty ==
On August 17, 2022, former FBI Special Agent Robert F. Cessario pleaded guilty to corruptly destroying an object to impair its use in an official proceeding. Cessario erased the contents of his government hard drive, knowing that a court had ordered the computer to be submitted for forensic examination, with the intent to impair the integrity and availability of the computer hard drive and its contents for use in an official proceeding.

Agent Cessario stated in the Factual Basis section of his Plea Agreement that “I erased the contents of the computer hard drive knowing that the Court had ordered that the computer be submitted for a forensic examination. I did so with the intention of making the contents of the computer’s hard drive unavailable for forensic examination. At the time, I knew that the contents of the hard drive were relevant to an official proceeding, that is Cause No. 5:17-CR-50010, United States v. Woods, et al. I corruptly performed, and had performed, the erasures with intent to impair the integrity and availability of the computer hard drive and its contents for use in that official proceeding.”

On January 3, 2023, he was sentenced in the Western District of Arkansas to three years’ probation (including six months’ home confinement) and a $25,000 fine.

== Lead Prosecutor Resigns ==
On September 22, 2017, President Donald Trump nominated Duane “Dak” Kees to serve as U.S. Attorney for the Western District of Arkansas; he was confirmed in December 2017 and sworn in on January 5, 2018. Kees resigned effective January 17, 2020, to return to private practice.

A subsequently released Department of Justice Office of Inspector General report concluded that Kees engaged in an intimate relationship with a subordinate during 2018, contrary to DOJ expectations for supervisory conduct; the report notes he resigned while the matter was under review.

In June 2023, Arkansas Attorney General Tim Griffin appointed Kees to the state’s Judicial Discipline and Disability Commission. He resigned from the commission on May 14, 2024 following public reporting on the OIG’s findings.

== Freedom of Information Act (FOIA) Lawsuit ==
Journalists Doug Thompson and Lisa Thompson, both with the NWA Democrat Gazette, filed a lawsuit against the FBI after the Department of Justice declined to produce records from its Office of Inspector General investigation of Special Agent Robert Cessario. The Thompsons alleged that the DOJ failed to comply with the statutory deadlines and violated FOIA’s requirements for timely determinations. After a FOIA request was denied and a FOIA appeal request was also denied, a lawsuit was filed by the Thompsons. They were seeking records related to FBI Special Agent Robert Cessario who had pleaded guilty in August, 2022, to erasing the hard drive of his work computer. Agent Cessario was aware that the court had ordered the computer to be turned over for forensic examination. Cessario also admitted in his plea agreement that he had obtained recordings from a cooperating defendant, placed the recordings on his government-issued laptop, and then wiped the computer after questions arose about when and in what manner he obtained the recordings.

Doug Thompson sent a FOIA request to the FBI seeking records on the findings and final recommendations of charges in the investigation of Cessario, as well as records showing disciplinary action taken against Cessario, when did he leave the FBI, and whether he now draws a pension from the FBI in August, 2022. The FBI responded in October, 2022, stating that, while the records exist, they are exempt from disclosure and release because they “would constitute an unwarranted invasion of personal privacy.”

December 22, 2022, an administrative appeal sought answers about how the public’s right to know about Cessario’s destruction of evidence was outweighed by privacy concerns and argued that Cessario’s last day and whether he received a pension could not be a matter of privacy that outweighed the public’s interest in the case.

Doug Thompson received correspondence from the FBI in April 2024, stating that “potentially responsive records” were found and that it would take more than five years to complete processing the 3,783 pages of records. Then in July, 2024, the lawsuit was filed by the Thompsons against the FBI. In November, 2024, Federal Judge Timothy Brooks ordered that some of the investigative documents be released and more processed. He also ordered the FBI to either turn the documents over or state why their production was not required by the FOIA. As the case progressed, Brooks also ordered the FBI to remove key redactions which answered some of the journalists’ questions. Some of those answers included that it appeared that the FBI took no disciplinary action against Cessario and that Cessario was ineligible for a pension when he resigned from the bureau.

The FBI filed a motion for summary judgment in March, 2026, saying it had released all the documents it was required to and that the lawsuit should be dismissed. The FBI denied violating the FOIA. An FBI attorney filed the motion to dismiss, and argued that the journalists were not entitled to the remaining documents because they were exempt from release under the law. Then in April, 2026, the Thompsons filed their own motion for summary judgment. They stated that the FBI had not yet released documents answering their original four questions. Stating that the FBI had repeatedly missed deadlines and provided no information regarding nearly 32,471 pages of potentially responsive records, the plaintiffs argued that the FBI had known about those records for the past 23 months.

Brooks ordered the FBI to deliver to him for his review almost 400 pages of documents that had been withheld by the FBI either fully or in part. His intention was to decide whether they were responsive to the FOIA request and whether or not the FBI violated the FOIA by not turning them over in a timely manner.

Judge Brooks granted the FBI’s motion for summary judgment in July, 2026, saying that he believed the FBI’s review process appeared thorough. Then the burden was on the Thompson’s to prove otherwise, which they failed to do. Judge Brooks agreed with the FBI, that the penalty for not responding in time is that the bureau could not “rely on the administrative exhaustion requirements to keep cases from getting into court,” stated in Brooks’ order.

== Election History ==
Arkansas State Senate District 7 Nov 6, 2012
Party	Candidate	Votes	%	±%
Republican	Jon Woods	15,110	64.76	
Democratic	Diana Gonzales Worthen	8,221	35.24	

Arkansas State Senate District 7 Primary May 22, 2012
Party	Candidate	Votes	%	±%
Republican	Jon Woods	2,784	51.58	
Republican	Bill Pritchard	2,613	48.42	

State Representative District 093 Primary May 23, 2006
Party	Candidate	Votes	%	±%
Republican	Jon Woods	1106	57.16	
Republican	Kathy McFetridge	829	42.84	
