= Chris Richey =

American politician

Member of the Arkansas House of Representatives from the 12th district
- In office January 14, 2013 – June 30, 2020
- Preceded by: Robert S. Moore Jr.
- Succeeded by: David Tollett

Personal details
- Born: September 1, 1971 (age 54) Benton, Arkansas, U.S.
- Party: Democratic
- Education: Ouachita Baptist University (BA); Arkansas State University (MA)

Chris Richey (born September 1, 1971, in Benton, Arkansas) is an American Democratic politician and former member of the Arkansas House of Representatives.

== Education ==
Richey earned his BA in history and political science from Ouachita Baptist University and his MA in history from Arkansas State University.

== Elections ==
- 2012 When District 12 Representative Robert Moore left the Legislature and left the seat open, Richey won the May 22, 2012 Democratic Primary with 2,082 votes (55.5%), and was unopposed for the November 6, 2012 General election, winning with 6,450 votes.

Richey resigned June 30, 2020 after moving out of the district for a new job.
