= Camille Bennett =

American lawyer and former politician

Member of the Arkansas House of Representatives from the 14th district
- In office January 2015 – January 2017
- Preceded by: Bill Sample
- Succeeded by: Roger D. Lynch

Personal details
- Born: 1960/1961 (age 64–65)
- Party: Democratic

Camille Bennett (born c. 1960) is a lawyer and former state legislator in Arkansas. A Democrat, she represented District 14 in the Arkansas House of Representatives from 2015–2017.

== Career ==
Prior to politics, Bennett worked as an assistant attorney general, a district judge and city attorney in Lonoke, Arkansas, and a researcher for the United States Sentencing Commission.

In 2014, Bennett ran as a Democrat for the House District 14 seat against Republican Buddy Fisher, whom she narrowly defeated. While in office, Bennett opposed Arkansas' religious freedom restoration act, Arkansas HB 1228, citing concerns from corporations that it might open them up to lawsuits. She proposed to send the bill back for revisions, bringing it closer to the federal Religious Freedom Restoration Act, but her proposal was rejected.

Bennett moved to Scott, Arkansas, shortly before the 2016 election. She lost to Republican Roger D. Lynch.

Bennett is a Methodist.
