= Davy Carter =

American politician

Speaker of the Arkansas House of Representatives
- In office January 2013 – January 2015
- Preceded by: Robert S. Moore Jr.
- Succeeded by: Jeremy Gillam

Member of the Arkansas House of Representatives from the 43rd district
- In office January 2009 – January 2015
- Succeeded by: Tim Lemons

Personal details
- Born: Russell Davis Carter; March 31, 1975 (age 51)
- Party: Republican
- Spouse: Cara Carter
- Education: Arkansas State University, Jonesboro (BS); Louisiana State University, Baton Rouge (MBA); University of Arkansas, Little Rock (JD)

Russell Davis Carter, known as Davy Carter (born March 31, 1975), is the Republican former Speaker of the Arkansas House of Representatives, a position which he held from 2013 to 2015. A resident of Cabot in Lonoke County, Carter represented District 43 from 2009 to 2015. Because of term limits, he was ineligible to seek reelection in 2014 and was succeeded by fellow Cabot Republican, Tim Lemons, a civil engineer. However, the term limits were modified in 2014, and Carter's successor as Speaker, Jeremy Gillam, continued for a second term as the presiding officer in Gillam's fourth term in the House.

== Personal life ==
Carter graduated from Arkansas State University at Jonesboro, Arkansas, the Louisiana State University School of Banking in Baton Rouge, and the William H. Bowen School of Law at the University of Arkansas at Little Rock. He is CEO of Jonesboro Community Bank, a subsidiary of Home BancShares Inc. of Conway, which was formed as a result of the merger of Centennial Bank and Liberty Bank of Arkansas.

== Political career ==
=== Tenure in the Arkansas House of Representatives ===
Carter ran for and was elected to the Arkansas House of Representatives in 2008 to represent the Cabot area of Lonoke County. He beat an intraparty rival in the Republican primary and was unopposed in the November election. He was selected to be Chairman of the Revenue and Taxation Committee during his second term and he served as Speaker of the House from 2013 to 2015.

In the Republican primary held on May 20, 2014, Tim Lemons succeeded Carter.

=== Chairman of the House Revenue and Taxation Committee ===
Carter served as Chairman of the Revenue and Taxation Committee during his second term. As Chairman, he held hearings to start the discussion of tax reform in Arkansas, during which he advocated for lower tax rates on families and businesses. “A working-class family with an annual income in the low $30,000 range is in the highest marginal tax bracket in Arkansas, even though that family’s income exceeds the federal poverty level by only $10,000 or so,” Carter said. “This needs to be addressed along with other tax ‘loopholes’ and how competitive we are with our surrounding states. Essentially, I’d like to see a broader base with lower rates across the board.”

=== Speaker of the House ===
Carter is the first Republican Speaker since Reconstruction. He won on a secret vote of fifty-two to forty-five against a more moderate fellow Republican, Terry Rice of Waldron in Scott County. Carter received a score of 89 from the Advance Arkansas Institute on issues of smaller government, individual freedom and lower taxes, ranking among the 10 most conservative members of the House. Carter depended on bipartisan support to win because his party controls only fifty-one of the one hundred House seats.

Carter was known for his good working relationship with former Democratic Governor Mike Beebe and had been mentioned as a Republican candidate to succeed Beebe in 2014. However, he declined to run for governor and instead endorsed the party's unsuccessful 2006 nominee for the post, former U.S. Representative Asa Hutchinson, who is also a former United States Secretary of Homeland Security. Hutchinson lost to Beebe by a wide margin in a heavily Democratic year but rebounded to win the governorship in 2014.

Political offices
Preceded by Robert S. Moore, Jr.	Speaker of the Arkansas House of Representatives; 2013–2015	Succeeded by Jeremy Gillam
