= Matthew Shepherd =

American politician

Speaker of the Arkansas House of Representatives
- In office June 15, 2018 – January 13, 2025
- Preceded by: Jeremy Gillam
- Succeeded by: Brian S. Evans

Member of the Arkansas House of Representatives from the 6th district
- Incumbent
- Assumed office January 1, 2011
- Preceded by: John Lowery

Personal details
- Born: Matthew Joseph Shepherd; February 21, 1976 (age 50) El Dorado, Arkansas, U.S.
- Party: Republican
- Spouse: Aile Shepherd
- Children: 3
- Parent: Bobby Shepherd (father)
- Education: Ouachita Baptist University (BA); University of Arkansas (JD)

Matthew Joseph Shepherd (born February 21, 1976) is an American attorney from his native El Dorado, Arkansas, who is a Republican member of the Arkansas House of Representatives for District 6, which includes western Union County. He was elected in the 2010, 2012, and 2014 legislative races.

In 2010, Shepherd claimed the District 6 seat by defeating Democrat Ken Bridges, 4,780 to 2,074. In 2012, still in the reorganized District 6, Shepherd won a second term, defeating Independent Peter Cyphers, 10,051 to 2,149.

Upon the resignation of Speaker Jeremy Gillam in June 2018, he was elected Speaker of the Arkansas House of Representatives for the 91st General Assembly. He was re-elected in January 2019 to serve as Speaker of the 92nd General Assembly and again in May 2020 for the 93rd General Assembly.

== Biography ==
Shepherd was born to Bobbi (née Beeson) and Bobby Shepherd, a federal circuit judge on the Eighth Circuit. Shepherd graduated in 1998 from the Southern Baptist-affiliated Ouachita Baptist University in Arkadelphia, South Arkansas, his parents' alma mater. In 2001, he received the Juris Doctor degree from the University of Arkansas School of Law at Fayetteville. Shepherd is a partner at the El Dorado-based law firm Shepherd & Shepherd, P.A., practicing alongside his brother John T. Shepherd.

== Personal life ==
Shepherd is married to his wife Alie (née Hill), who is also an Ouachita Baptist graduate ('99). They live in El Dorado with their three teenage children, Eli, Mary Kate, and Libby. They are members of First Baptist Church, where Shepherd is a deacon and Sunday school teacher. Shepherd is also a board member of the Arkansas Baptist Foundation, the Boys and Girls Club of El Dorado, and El Dorado Fifty for the Future and serves as president of the Murphy USA Classic football game.

== See also ==
- List of speakers of the Arkansas House of Representatives

Political offices
Preceded by Jeremy Gillam	Speaker of the Arkansas House of Representatives; 2018–2025	Succeeded by Brian S. Evans
