= David Fielding =

American politician (born 1955)

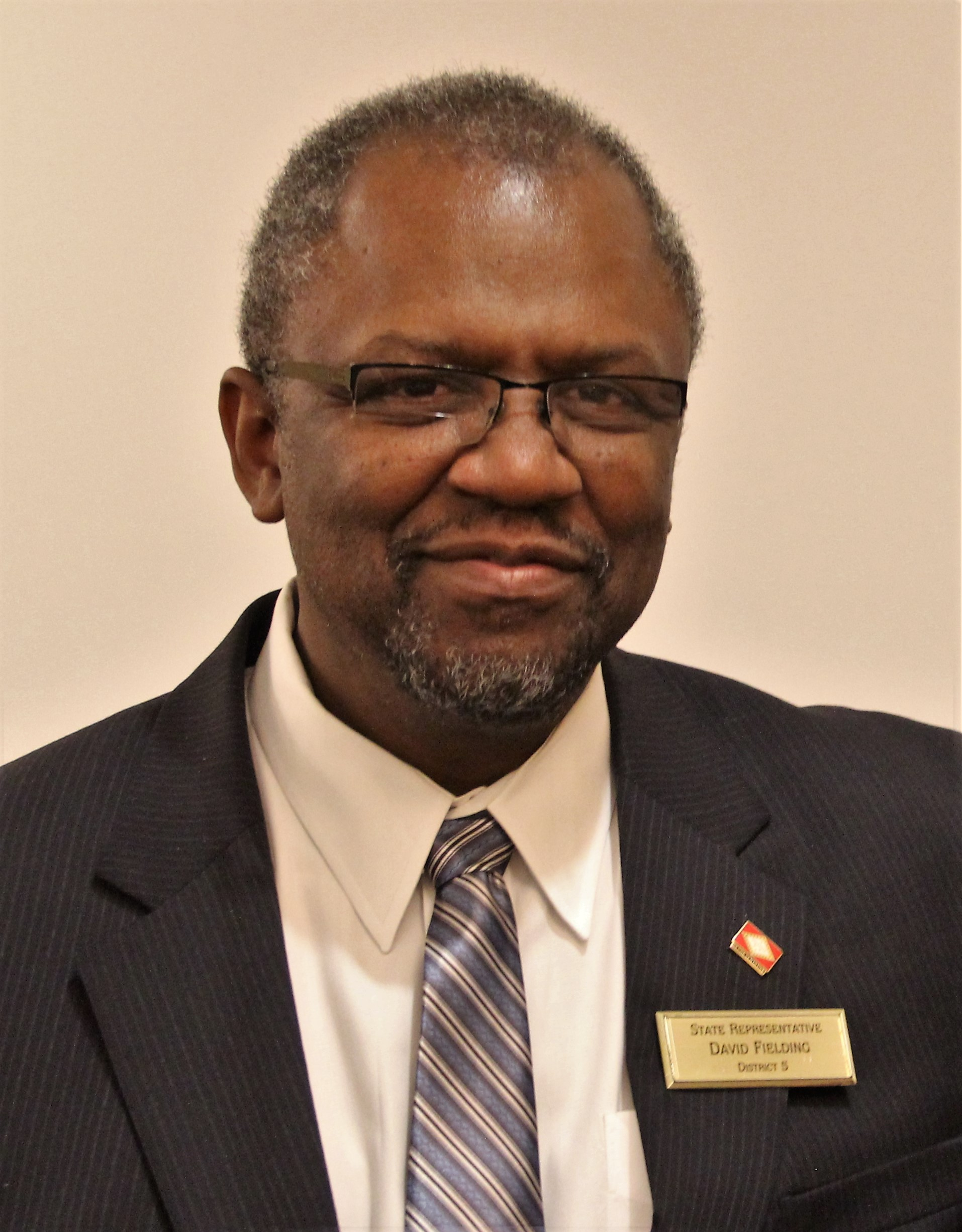

Member of the Arkansas House of Representatives from the 5th district
- In office January 1, 2011 – January 9, 2023
- Preceded by: Willie Hardy
- Succeeded by: Wade Andrews

Personal details
- Born: June 20, 1955 (age 71)
- Party: Democratic
- Education: Southern Arkansas University

David Fielding (born June 20, 1955) is an American politician who served as a Democratic member of the Arkansas House of Representatives representing District 5 from 2011 until 2023.

== Education ==
Fielding attended Southern Arkansas University.

== Elections ==
- 2022 Fielding was opposed for the November 8, 2022 General Election. Losing the race to Republican Wade Andrews.
- 2012 Fielding was unopposed for both the May 22, 2012 Democratic primary and the November 6, 2012 general election.
- 2010 When District 5 Representative Willie Hardy left the Legislature and left the seat open, Fielding placed first in the three-way May 18, 2010 Democratic Primary with 1,866 votes (49.6%), won the June 8 runoff election with 1,545 votes (53.7%), and was unopposed for the November 2, 2010 General election.
