= Joe Farrer =

American politician from Arkansas

Member of the Arkansas House of Representatives from the 44th district
- In office January 2013 – January 2019
- Succeeded by: Cameron Cooper

Lonoke County Justice of the Peace

Personal details
- Party: Republican
- Education: University of Central Arkansas
- Occupation: Business owner, physical therapist

Joe Farrer is an American politician who served as a member of the Arkansas House of Representatives from the 44th district.
