= Jim Hendren =

American politician (born 1963)

President pro tempore of the Arkansas Senate
- In office January 14, 2019 – January 11, 2021
- Preceded by: Jonathan Dismang
- Succeeded by: Jimmy Hickey Jr.

Majority Leader of the Arkansas Senate
- In office January 13, 2015 – January 14, 2019
- Preceded by: Eddie Joe Williams
- Succeeded by: Bart Hester

Member of the Arkansas Senate from the 2nd district
- In office January 2013 – January 2023
- Preceded by: Randy Laverty
- Succeeded by: redistricted

Member of the Arkansas House of Representatives from the 1st district
- In office January 1995 – January 8, 2001
- Preceded by: Railey Steele
- Succeeded by: Kim Hendren

Personal details
- Born: James Paul Hendren; August 12, 1963 (age 63) Gravette, Arkansas, U.S.
- Party: Republican (Before 2021); Independent (2021–present)
- Spouse: Tammy Hendren
- Children: 4
- Relatives: Tim Hutchinson (uncle); Asa Hutchinson (uncle)
- Education: University of Arkansas (BS)

Military service
- Allegiance: United States
- Branch/service: United States Air Force
- Years of service: 1984–1992
- Rank: Lieutenant colonel
- Space career

Commercial Astronaut
- Time in space: 10 minutes 12 seconds
- Mission: Blue Origin NS-38

James Paul Hendren (born August 12, 1963) is an American politician who served as a member of the Arkansas Senate from the 2nd district. From January 2019 to January 2021, he served as Senate Majority Leader.

Until February 2021, he was a Republican; but he had left his party in the wake of the 2021 storming of the United States Capitol. He resides in Sulphur Springs in Benton County in Northwest Arkansas. He is the nephew of former Governor of Arkansas Asa Hutchinson and former U.S. Representative Tim Hutchinson.

== Early life and education ==
A native of Gravette in Benton County, Hendren spent a semester at Bob Jones University and graduated in 1984 with a degree in electrical engineering from the University of Arkansas at Fayetteville.

== Career ==
From 1984 to 1992, he served in the United States Air Force. A former F-15 fighter pilot, he flew in six intercepts of planes of the former Soviet Union over the Bering Sea. Since 2003, he has been a senior offensive duty guard in the Arkansas Air National Guard. He owns Hendren Plastics Company. He and his wife, Tammy Claire Hendren (born 1964), have four children, Daniel, David, Nick, and Molly. He is a Baptist.

=== Arkansas Legislature ===
Hendren was elected to the Gravette School Board in 1992.

In 1994, Hendren defeated Representative Railey Steele in a race for the Arkansas House of Representatives. He remained a state representative until 2000. During this time, he worked for passage of several pieces of anti-abortion legislation, including a ban on partial birth abortions in 1996 and the Fetal Protection Law of 1999.

In 2001, Hendren ran unsuccessfully to succeed his uncles, Asa Hutchinson and Tim Hutchinson, representing Arkansas's 3rd congressional district in a special election campaign that was hampered by reports of an extramarital affair. Hendren finished third in the Republican primary.

In 2003, Hendren returned to military service and joined the Missouri Air National Guard, of which he holds the rank of lieutenant colonel.

In 2012, Hendren ran unopposed for the state Senate; his initial four-year term expired on December 31, 2016. Re-elected in the 2016 election, Hendren served on the Education Facilities Oversight Committee and the Arkansas Legislative Council. He was a member of four other Senate committees: Budget, Children & Youth, Education, and Energy . Hendren passed legislation exempting all active duty and National Guard personnel from state income tax in 2013. He was also appointed chairman of a Joint Task Force charged with reforming public school and Arkansas State Employee Insurance programs.

In January 2021, Hendren stepped down as the state's Senate Majority Leader. On February 19, in an interview with MSNBC, he officially disaffiliated from the Republican Party, re-registering as an independent, citing the party's lack of safety and increased partisanship particularly in the 2021 storming of the United States Capitol, and announced that he would form a new organization to be called "Common Ground Arkansas".

== Controversies ==
In 2020, a Federal judge ordered Hendren Plastics and DARP Foundation to pay more than $1.1 million in back wages and damages to workers who were forced to work without pay at Hendren Plastics. District Judge Timothy Brooks wrote that “They were businesses that manipulated the labor market and skirted compliance with the labor laws for their own private ends,” The DARP Foundation was a work-based rehab in which many participants had their participation court ordered in lieu of incarceration. DARP supplied workers to Hendren's Hendren Plastics who used them as a “captive workforce.” Not only was the misuse of rehab workers abusive but it also displaced private sector employees at Hendren Plastics who had enjoyed a significantly higher wage than the temporary laborers. Injuries to the workers at Hendren Plastics were commonplace with seriously injured workers being kicked out of the program and sent to prison, this created an incentive to massively underreport workplace injuries.

== Personal life ==
His father, Kim Hendren, is a former member of the Arkansas Senate and in a second stint in office a member of the Arkansas House of Representatives from 2015 to 2017. His sister, Gayla Hendren McKenzie, served in the State House, but retired to run for State Senate in 2022. Another sister, Hope Hendren Duke, was elected to the State House in 2022. Through his mother, the former Marylea Hutchinson, his cousins include fellow State Senator Jeremy Hutchinson and former State Representative Timothy Chad Hutchinson, sons of former Senator Tim Hutchinson, and Hutchinson's first wife, Donna.

On January 21, 2026, Hendren flew to space on Blue Origin NS-38, reaching an altitude of 107 km.

Arkansas House of Representatives
Preceded by Railey Steele	Member of the Arkansas House of Representatives from the 1st district 1995–2000	Succeeded by Kim Hendren
Arkansas Senate
Preceded by Randy Laverty	Member of the Arkansas Senate from the 2nd district 2013–present	Incumbent
Preceded by Eddie Joe Williams	Majority Leader of the Arkansas Senate; 2015–2019	Succeeded by Bart Hester
Preceded by Jonathan Dismang	President pro tempore of the Arkansas Senate; 2019–2021	Succeeded by Jimmy Hickey Jr.
