= Joe Jett =

American politician

Member of the Arkansas House of Representatives
- Constituency: District 56

Personal details
- Born: Joseph Edward Jett c. 1960
- Party: Republican
- Education: University of Virginia, Business School of Darden
- Occupation: Politician

Joseph Edward Jett (born c. 1960) is an American politician from the state of Arkansas. A member of the Republican Party since December 2016, Jett represents District 56 in the Arkansas House of Representatives. Jett switched parties shortly after winning reelection in 2016 as a Democrat.

In 2013, Jett was selected by the University of Virginia, Business School of Darden, as one of the top 50 up and coming legislators in the United States.

In 2019, Jett was re-elected to a fourth term in the Arkansas House of Representatives for District 56.

Jett is from rural Success in Clay County in the northeastern corner of his state. Before he was elected to the Arkansas House, Mike Beebe, the Democratic governor of Arkansas, appointed Jett to the Arkansas Department of Aeronautics Commission in 2007.
