= Keith Ingram =

American politician

Minority Leader of the Arkansas Senate
- In office January 15, 2013 – January 9, 2023
- Preceded by: Ruth Whitaker
- Succeeded by: Greg Leding

Member of the Arkansas Senate from the 24th district
- In office January 15, 2013 – January 9, 2023
- Preceded by: Jimmy Jeffress
- Succeeded by: Missy Irvin

Member of the Arkansas House of Representatives from the 53rd district
- In office January 2009 – January 15, 2013
- Preceded by: Denny Sumpter
- Succeeded by: Homer Lenderman

11th Mayor of West Memphis
- In office 1987–1994
- Preceded by: Leo Chitman
- Succeeded by: Al Boals

Personal details
- Born: April 12, 1955 (age 71) West Memphis, Arkansas, U.S.
- Party: Democratic
- Relatives: Bill Ingram (Father)
- Education: University of Arkansas, Fayetteville; University of Mississippi, Oxford (BA)
- Website: Campaign website

Keith M. Ingram (born April 12, 1955) is an American politician from the state of Arkansas. A member of the Democratic Party, Ingram represents the 24th district in the Arkansas Senate, of which he is the Minority Leader. Ingram's district includes Crittenden County and parts of Cross, Lee, Phillips and St. Francis counties in eastern Arkansas.

He previously represented the 53rd district in the Arkansas House of Representatives for from January 2009 – January 2013 and served as mayor of West Memphis, Arkansas.

== Career ==
While he was Senator-elect, Ingram was selected as the Democrats' Minority Leader to succeed the party's former Majority Leader Robert F. Thompson of Paragould in Greene County in northeastern Arkansas. He considered running for Governor of Arkansas, in the 2014 election, when the incumbent Democrat Mike Beebe was term-limited but did not file for the higher office.

Ingram is a member of National Conference of State Legislatures, the Council of State Governments and the Southern Legislative Conference. With NCSL, he serves on the Law & Criminal Justice Standing Committee and sits on the Annual Meeting Committee for CSG. In addition to serving as 2014 chairman of the Southern Legislative Conference, he sits on the Energy & Environment Committee.

== Business career ==
Ingram currently serves as vice president of Razorback Concrete Company, a family-owned business in West Memphis.

== Family ==
Ingram's father, William K. Ingram, was an Arkansas state senator from 1963 until 1981, while his brother, Kent Ingram, served for nine years in the state Senate.

Arkansas Senate
Preceded by Ruth Whitaker	Minority Leader of the Arkansas Senate; 2013–2023	Succeeded by Greg Leding
