= Lane Jean =

American politician (born 1958)

Samuel Lane Jean

Member of the Arkansas House of Representatives from the 99th district
- Incumbent
- Assumed office January 9, 2023
- Preceded by: Jack Fortner

Member of the Arkansas House of Representatives from the 2nd district
- In office January 1, 2013 – January 9, 2023
- Preceded by: Larry Cowling
- Succeeded by: Trey Steimel

Member of the Arkansas House of Representatives from the 4th district
- In office January 1, 2011 – December 31, 2012
- Preceded by: Bruce Maloch
- Succeeded by: Fonda Hawthorne

Mayor of Magnolia, Arkansas
- In office 1995 – December 31, 2010
- Succeeded by: Parnell Vann

Personal details
- Born: November 10, 1958 (age 67) Magnolia, Arkansas
- Party: Republican
- Education: Abilene Christian University; Southern Arkansas University

Samuel Lane Jean (born November 10, 1958) is a Republican member of the Arkansas House of Representatives for District 2, which includes parts of Lafayette, Miller, and Columbia counties. He has held this seat since January 2013. Jean served as mayor of Magnolia, Arkansas between 1995 and 2010.

== Early life and education ==
Jean was born in Magnolia, Arkansas on November 10, 1958. He has a brother, Hal. Jean graduated from Magnolia High School and attended Abilene Christian University in Abilene, Texas. In 1984, he received a BA in History from Southern Arkansas University in Magnolia. Jean's mother Katheryn (1929-2007), a native of Birmingham, Alabama, was president of the Reeves Land and Timber Company in Magnolia and active in Columbia County's Republican Party.

== Career ==
Jean served as mayor of Magnolia between 1995 and 2010. Like his mother, he was also a Columbia County justice of the peace. Jean won his District 4 House seat in the 2010 Arkansas elections, succeeding the term-limited Democrat, Bruce Maloch, who moved on to the Arkansas State Senate, and defeating the Democratic nominee, Raymond Robertson, with 52.5% of the vote. In 2012, he was elected by colleagues as the House Republic Whip under then Majority Leader Bruce Westerman and subsequent Speaker of the Arkansas House of Representatives Davy Carter, who was elected as the presiding officer of the House in 2013. In January 2013, he became the District 2 representative. As of March 2023, Jean is the House Chair for the Joint Budget Committee and is a member of the House Revenue and Taxation Committee and the House State Agencies and Governmental Affairs Committee. He was elected to the 99th district in November 2022, and assumed office in 2023.

Jean is opposed to abortion and voted to ban the practice after 20 weeks of gestation. He voted to allow university staff to carry concealed weapons and to require picture identification for voting. In February 2015, he introduced legislation to reduce unemployment compensation benefits. The measure was promptly signed into law by the newly-elected Governor Asa Hutchinson.

== Personal life ==
Jean and his wife Judith have two children and one grandchild. In addition to politics, he works in the cattle, timber, and real estate businesses. He is a member of the Church of Christ in Emerson and is affiliated with Rotary International and the Arkansas Municipal League. He is a former Southern Arkansas University trustee and former commissioner of the Arkansas Department of Economic Development.

Preceded by Bruce Maloch	Arkansas State Representative for District 4; 2011–2013	Succeeded by Fonda Hawthorne
Preceded by Larry Cowling	Arkansas State Representative for District 2; 2013–2023	Succeeded by Trey Steimel
Preceded by	Arkansas State Representative for District 99; 2023–	Succeeded by Incumbent
