= Bryan King (politician) =

American politician (born 1968)

Bryan B. King
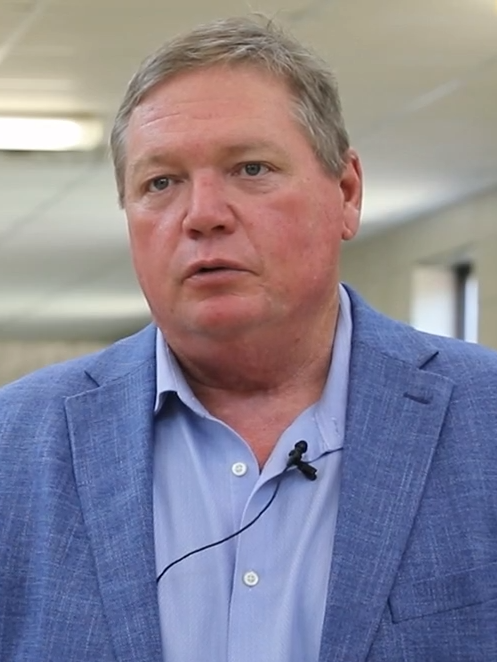

Member of the Arkansas Senate from the 28th district (Previously 5th district)
- Incumbent
- Assumed office January 9, 2023
- Preceded by: Bob Ballinger
- In office January 14, 2013 – January 14, 2019
- Preceded by: redistricted
- Succeeded by: Bob Ballinger

Member of the Arkansas House of Representatives from the 91st district
- In office 2007–2013
- Preceded by: Phillip E. Jackson
- Succeeded by: redistricted

Personal details
- Born: September 16, 1968 (age 58) Springdale, Arkansas, USA
- Party: Republican
- Education: Green Forest High School; University of Arkansas
- Occupation: Farmer

Bryan B. King (born September 16, 1968) is a Republican politician serving in the Arkansas Senate representing the 28th district (Carroll and Madison County and parts of Boone, Crawford, Newton, and Johnson counties). He previously served in the Senate from 2013 to 2019, and in the Arkansas House of Representatives from 2007 to 2013.

== Early life ==
He was born in Springdale, Arkansas, and graduated from Green Forest High School in Green Forest in Carroll County. He received a Bachelor of Science degree in Animal Science from the Dale Bumpers College of Agricultural, Food and Life Sciences at the University of Arkansas.

== Career ==
He owns Triple K Farms in Green Forest.

From 2007 to 2013, he served as a Republican member of the Arkansas House of Representatives for District 91. He was a member of the House Insurance and Commerce Committee, the Arkansas Legislative Council, where he was chairman of the Personnel Committee, the Joint Budget Committee and the House Public Health, Welfare and Labor Committee.

From 2013 to 2019, he has served as state senator.

As such, he is the chairman of Legislative Joint Auditing Committee and a member of the Senate Judiciary, Senate State Agencies Governmental Affairs, Senate Rules, Resolutions & Memorials, Joint Performance Review, Joint Budget Committee (JBC), the Arkansas Legislative Council and JBC Claims. In January 2013, he introduced a bill allowing concealed carry handguns in churches or other places of worship.

When King moved to the Senate, the Republican Dan Douglas of Bentonville ran without opposition for King's District 91 House seat.

== Personal life ==
He attends the Church on the Hill Assembly of God in Berryville in Carroll County.

Preceded by Bob Ballinger	Arkansas State Senator for District 5 (Madison, Carroll, Boone, Crawford, Newton, and Johnson counties); 2023–	Succeeded by incumbent
Preceded by Stephanie Flowers	Arkansas State Senator for District 5 (Madison, Carroll, Crawford, Franklin, Johnson, Sebastian, and Washington counties); 2013–2019	Succeeded by Bob Ballinger
Preceded by Phillip E. Jackson	Arkansas State Representative for District 91 (now part of Benton County); 2007–2013	Succeeded by Dan Douglas
