= Michael Lamoureux =

American politician (born 1976)

President pro tempore of the Arkansas Senate
- In office January 2013 – November 14, 2014
- Preceded by: Paul Bookout
- Succeeded by: Jonathan Dismang

Member of the Arkansas Senate from the 16th district
- In office January 2013 – November 14, 2014
- Preceded by: James Word
- Succeeded by: Greg Standridge

Member of the Arkansas Senate from the 4th district
- In office December 16, 2009 – January 2013
- Preceded by: Sharon Trusty
- Succeeded by: Uvalde Lindsey

Member of the Arkansas House of Representatives from the 68th district
- In office January 2003 – January 2009
- Preceded by: David Evans
- Succeeded by: Andrea Lea

Personal details
- Born: June 2, 1976 (age 50) Springfield, Missouri, USA
- Party: Republican
- Spouse: Kristi Lamoureux
- Education: Arkansas Tech University; William H. Bowen School of Law
- Occupation: Lawyer, lobbyist

Michael John Lamoureux (born June 2, 1976) is a lawyer, lobbyist, and former Republican politician from Russellville, Arkansas. He served in the Arkansas General Assembly for over ten years before resigning to serve as chief of staff to Governor Asa Hutchinson. In 2016, Lamoureux resigned and joined a lobbying firm.

== Early life and career ==
Lamoureux was born in Springfield, Missouri and later moved to Dover in Pope County and then the county seat of Russellville. While a senior at Dover High School and attending Arkansas Tech University, he dreamed of winning election to public office.

He later attended William H. Bowen School of Law at the University of Arkansas at Little Rock. Lamoureux worked part-time as a lawyer for the Arkansas Public Defender Commission.

== Electoral history ==
=== Arkansas House of Representatives ===
Lamoureux won election to the Arkansas House of Representatives in November 2002, and was seated in the 84th Arkansas General Assembly at age 26. He served in the House and won re-election twice until declining to seek reelection in the November 2008 election. Throughout his time in the House, Lamoureux was part of the Republican minority, though the party was slowly gaining seats each cycle, and Republican Governor of Arkansas Mike Huckabee was term limited out on January 9, 2007.

=== 2009 Arkansas Senate (Special) ===
Russellville Republican Sharon Trusty resigned from her Arkansas Senate District 4 seat on September 1, 2009, citing family needs, leading to a special election. Lamoureux had previously campaigned for Trusty in 1996, and sought the seat in the special election. On December 16, 2009, Lamoureux won the special election to fill the District 4 seat. In a low-turnout contest, he polled 2,955 votes (70.1 percent); the Democrat John Burnett trailed with 899 votes (21.3 percent). The remaining 8.6 percent of the ballots went to the Independent Tachany Evans.

Arkansas Senate District 4 Special Election
Party	Candidate	Votes	%
Republican	Michael Lamoureux	2,955	70.1%
Democratic	John Burnett	899	21.3%
Independent	Tachany Evans	363	8.6%
Republican hold			

In 2011, Senator Lamoureux introduced a bill to double vehicle title fees.

=== 2012 Arkansas Senate ===
Lamoureux won re-election to a full Senate term in November 2012 without opposition in the Republican primary or the general election. Following the November 2012 elections, Lamoureux was nominated by fellow senators to be the President Pro Tempore of the Senate in ahead of the 89th Arkansas General Assembly. Now in the majority for the first time since the Reconstruction era, the Republican met frequently with Democratic Governor Mike Beebe.

He has been a member of the board of directors of the conservative interest group, the American Legislative Exchange Council.

== Hutchinson administration ==
Lamoureux stepped down from the Arkansas Senate on November 14, 2014 to lead the transition team for the incoming governor Asa Hutchinson's administration, and ultimately become his chief of staff. The appointment had been expected by insiders and was praised by legislators from both parties. A special election was called to fill the District 16 seat, ultimately won by Greg Standridge. Lamoureux resigned from the governor's office May 31, 2016.

Preceded by James Word	Arkansas State Senator for District 16 (Newton and Pope counties and parts of Boone, Carroll and Van Buren counties); 2013–November 14, 2014	Succeeded by Greg Standridge
Preceded by Sharon Trusty	Arkansas State Senator from District 4 (now Washington County); 2009–2013	Succeeded by Uvalde Lindsey
Preceded by David Evans	Arkansas House of Representatives; District 68 (Pope County); January 2003–2009	Succeeded by Andrea Lea
