= 2014 Arkansas elections =

A general election was held in the U.S. state of Arkansas on November 4, 2014. All of Arkansas' executive officers were up for election as well as a United States Senate seat, and all of Arkansas' four seats in the United States House of Representatives. Primary elections were held on May 20, 2014, for offices that need to nominate candidates. Primary runoffs, necessary if no candidate wins a majority of the vote, were held on June 10, 2014.

In the 2014 general election in Arkansas, Republican candidates won all statewide executive offices, the U.S. Senate seat up for election, majorities in both state legislative chambers, and all four U.S. House seats, decisively ending over 130 years of Democratic dominance in the state.

== Governor ==
Incumbent Democratic governor Mike Beebe was term-limited and could not run for re-election to a third term as governor.

Democratic nominee former U.S. representative Mike Ross, Republican nominee former U.S. representative Asa Hutchinson, Green nominee Josh Drake and Libertarian nominee Frank Gilbert contested in the general election.

With Hutchinson's victory, Republicans gained a trifecta for the first time since 1874.

=== Results ===
Arkansas gubernatorial election, 2014
Party	Candidate	Votes	%
Republican	Asa Hutchinson	470,429	55.44
Democratic	Mike Ross	352,115	41.49
Libertarian	Frank Gilbert	16,319	1.92
Green	Josh Drake	9,729	1.15
Majority		118,314	13.94
Total votes		848,592	100
Republican gain from Democratic			

== Lieutenant governor ==
2014 Arkansas lieutenant gubernatorial election
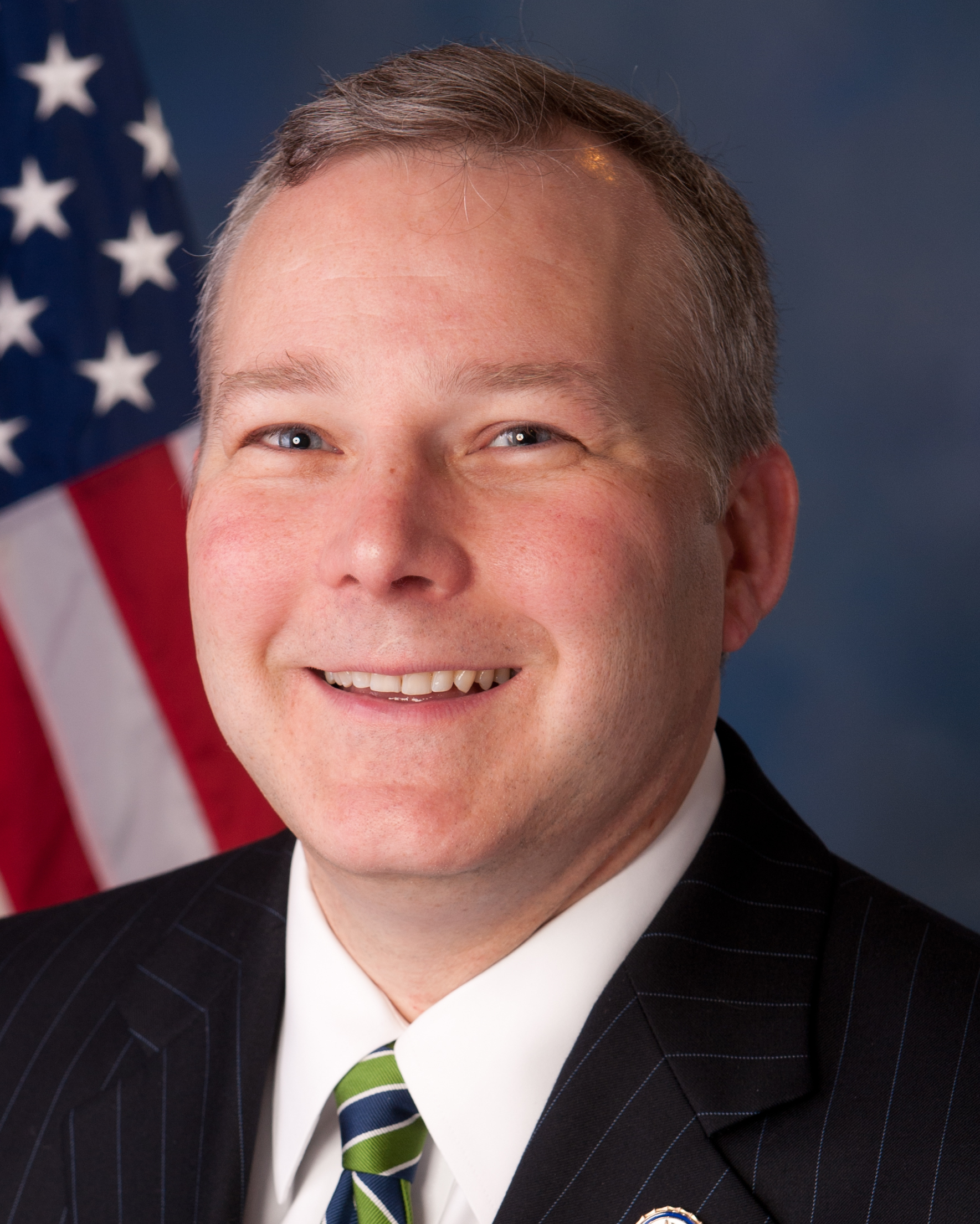

Nominee	Tim Griffin	John Burkhalter
Party	Republican	Democratic
Popular vote	479,673	324,260
Percentage	57.16%	38.64%
- County results Griffin: 40–50% 50–60% 60–70% Burkhalter: 40–50% 50–60% 60–70%
Lieutenant Governor before election
Vacant
Elected Lieutenant Governor
Tim Griffin
Republican

The office of lieutenant governor had been vacant since Republican Mark Darr resigned on February 1, 2014, while under investigation for ethics violations involving illegal use of campaign funds.

=== Republican primary ===
==== Confirmed candidates ====
- Tim Griffin, U.S. representative
- Debra Hobbs, state representative
- Andy Mayberry, state representative ran for the Republican nomination.

==== Withdrawn candidates ====
- Charlie Collins, state representative

==== Polling ====
Poll source	Date(s) administered	Sample size	Margin of error	Tim Griffin	Debra Hobbs	Andy Mayberry	Undecided
Talk Business/Hendrix College	April 29, 2014	1,516	± 2.5%	54%	6%	15%	26%
Public Policy Polling	April 25–27, 2014	342	± 5.3%	39%	8%	19%	34%

==== Primary results ====
Republican primary results
Party	Candidate	Votes	%
Republican	Tim Griffin	109,851	63.37
Republican	Andy Mayberry	35,703	20.59
Republican	Debra Hobbs	27,803	16.04
Total votes		173,357	100

=== Democratic nominee ===
- John Burkhalter, former state Highway Commissioner

==== Withdrawn ====
- Dianne Curry, president of the Little Rock School Board

=== Libertarian nominee ===
- Chris Olson

=== General election ===
==== Polling ====
Poll source	Date(s) administered	Sample size	Margin of error	Tim Griffin (R)	John Burkhalter (D)	Christopher Olson (L)	Undecided
Public Policy Polling	October 30–November 1, 2014	1,092	± 3%	46%	38%	6%	11%
Suffolk	September 20–23, 2014	500	± 4.4%	35%	42%	5%	18%
Public Policy Polling	September 18–21, 2014	1,453	± 2.6%	42%	36%	4%	18%
Public Policy Polling	August 1–3, 2014	1,066	± 3%	41%	32%	6%	21%
Public Policy Polling	April 25–27, 2014	840	± 3.4%	39%	30%	—	31%

==== Results ====
Arkansas lieutenant gubernatorial election, 2014
Party	Candidate	Votes	%
Republican	Tim Griffin	479,673	57.16
Democratic	John Burkhalter	324,260	38.64
Libertarian	Christopher Olson	35,257	4.20
Majority		155,413	18.52
Total votes		839,190	100
Republican hold			

== Attorney general ==
Incumbent Democratic Attorney General Dustin McDaniel was term-limited and could not run for re-election to a third term in office.

State Representative Nate Steel ran for the Democrats. Attorney Zac White, who had considered running, endorsed Steel and instead ran for the state senate.

Leslie Rutledge was the Republican nominee and emerged victorious.

Arkansas Attorney General election, 2014
Party	Candidate	Votes	%
Republican	Leslie Rutledge	430,799	51.61
Democratic	Nate Steel	360,680	43.21
Libertarian	Aaron Cash	43,245	5.18
Majority		70,119	8.40
Total votes		834,724	100
Republican gain from Democratic			

== Secretary of State ==
Incumbent Republican secretary of state Mark Martin won re-election to a second term in office.

Arkansas Secretary of State election, 2014
Party	Candidate	Votes	%
Republican	Mark Martin (incumbent)	506,384	60.61
Democratic	Susan Inman	292,878	35.06
Libertarian	Jacob Holloway	36,159	4.33
Majority		213,506	25.55
Total votes		835,421	100
Republican hold			

== State Treasurer ==
2014 Arkansas State Treasurer election
Nominee	Dennis Milligan	Karen Sealy Garcia
Party	Republican	Democratic
Popular vote	466,959	308,663
Percentage	56.38%	37.27%
- County results Milligan: 40–50% 50–60% 60–70% Garcia: 40–50% 50–60% 60–70%
State Treasurer before election
Charles Robinson
Democratic
Elected State Treasurer
Dennis Milligan
Republican

Incumbent Democratic State Treasurer Charles Robinson, who served in the office from May 29, 2013, did not run for re-election, per the terms of his appointment. He was appointed to the office following the resignation of Martha Shoffner.

=== Democratic nominee ===
- Karen Sealy Garcia, accountant

=== Republican primary ===
==== Candidates ====
- Duncan Baird, state representative
- Dennis Milligan, Saline County Circuit Clerk and former chairman of the Republican Party of Arkansas

==== Polling ====
Poll source	Date(s) administered	Sample size	Margin of error	Duncan Baird	Dennis Milligan	Undecided
Talk Business/Hendrix College	April 29, 2014	1,516	± 2.5%	10%	16%	75%

==== Primary results ====
Republican primary results
Party	Candidate	Votes	%
Republican	Dennis Milligan	86,994	53.48
Republican	Duncan Baird	75,673	46.52
Total votes		162,667	100

=== Libertarian nominee ===
- Chris Hayes

=== General election ===
==== Polling ====
Poll source	Date(s) administered	Sample size	Margin of error	Karen Garcia (D)	Dennis Milligan (R)	Chris Hayes (L)	Undecided
Public Policy Polling	October 30–November 1, 2014	1,092	± 3%	37%	45%	10%	9%
Public Policy Polling	September 18–21, 2014	1,453	± 2.6%	31%	39%	7%	23%
Public Policy Polling	August 1–3, 2014	1,066	± 3%	31%	36%	10%	23%

==== Results ====
Arkansas State Treasurer election, 2014
Party	Candidate	Votes	%
Republican	Dennis Milligan	466,959	56.38
Democratic	Karen Sealy Garcia	308,663	37.27
Libertarian	Chris Hayes	52,640	6.35
Majority		158,296	19.11
Total votes		828,262	100
Republican gain from Democratic			

== State Auditor ==
2014 Arkansas State Auditor election
Nominee	Andrea Lea	Regina Stewart Hampton
Party	Republican	Democratic
Popular vote	471,211	308,285
Percentage	57.17%	37.40%
- County results Lea: 40–50% 50–60% 60–70% 70–80% Hampton: 40–50% 50–60% 60–70%
State Auditor before election
Charlie Daniels
Democratic
Elected State Auditor
Andrea Lea
Republican

Incumbent Democratic State Auditor Charlie Daniels chose to retire rather than run for re-election to a second term.

=== Democratic nominee ===
- Regina Stewart Hampton, employee in the Unclaimed Property Division of the State Auditor's Office

=== Republican primary ===
==== Candidates ====
- Andrea Lea, state representative
- Ken Yang, former campaign manager for Mark Martin

==== Polling ====
Poll source	Date(s) administered	Sample size	Margin of error	Andrea Lea	Ken Yang	Undecided
Talk Business/Hendrix College	April 29, 2014	1,516	± 2.5%	32%	12%	56%

==== Primary results ====
Republican primary results
Party	Candidate	Votes	%
Republican	Andrea Lea	111,998	68.17
Republican	Ken Yang	52,293	31.83
Total votes		164,291	100

=== Libertarian nominee ===
- Brian Leach

=== General election ===
==== Polling ====
Poll source	Date(s) administered	Sample size	Margin of error	Regina Stewart Hampton (D)	Andrea Lea (R)	Brian Leach (L)	Undecided
Public Policy Polling	October 30–November 1, 2014	1,092	± 3%	36%	44%	8%	12%
Public Policy Polling	September 18–21, 2014	1,453	± 2.6%	33%	37%	7%	24%
Public Policy Polling	August 1–3, 2014	1,066	± 3%	31%	35%	10%	24%

==== Results ====
Arkansas State Auditor election, 2014
Party	Candidate	Votes	%
Republican	Andrea Lea	471,211	57.17
Democratic	Regina Stewart Hampton	308,285	37.40
Libertarian	Brian Leach	44,702	5.43
Majority		162,926	19.77
Total votes		824,198	100
Republican gain from Democratic			

== Commissioner of State Lands ==
Incumbent Republican Commissioner of State Lands John Thurston ran for re-election to a second term in office.

Arkansas Commissioner of State Lands election, 2014
Party	Candidate	Votes	%
Republican	John Thurston (incumbent)	471,848	57.17
Democratic	Mark Robertson	302,048	36.59
Libertarian	Elvis D. Presley	51,518	6.24
Majority		169,800	20.58
Total votes		825,414	100
Republican hold			

== United States Senate ==
Incumbent Democratic senator Mark Pryor ran for re-election to a third term. Republican Tom Cotton, Green Mark Swaney and Libertarian Nathan LaFrance also ran.

U.S. Senate election in Arkansas, 2014
Party	Candidate	Votes	%
Republican	Tom Cotton	478,819	56.50
Democratic	Mark Pryor (incumbent)	334,174	39.43
Libertarian	Nathan LaFrance	17,210	2.03
Green	Mark Swaney	16,797	1.98
Write-in		505	0.06
Majority		144,645	17.07
Total votes		847,505	100
Republican gain from Democratic			

== United States House of Representatives ==
All of Arkansas' four seats in the United States House of Representatives were up for election in 2014. Republicans held all four districts.

== General Assembly ==
=== State Senate ===
18 out of 35 seats in the Arkansas Senate were up for election. Republicans won 13 while Democrats won five. The resulting composition was 24 Republicans and 11 Democrats, with Republicans making a gain of three seats.

2014 Arkansas Senate election
Party	Before	After	Change
Republican	21	24	▲3
Democratic	13	11	▼2
vacant	1	0	▼1
Total	35		

=== State House of Reresentatives ===
All 100 seats in the Arkansas House of Representatives were up for election. Republicans won 64 while Democrats won 36, with Republicans gaining 13 seats.

2014 Arkansas House of Representatives election
Party	Before	After	Change
Republican	51	64	▲13
Democratic	48	36	▼12
Green	1	0	▼1
Total	100		

== State Supreme Court ==
Three seats on the Arkansas Supreme Court were up for election, only one of which was contested.

=== Associate Justice, Position 2 ===
Incumbent Justice Donald Corbin retired at the end of his term. Robin Wynne, a judge on the Arkansas Court of Appeals, narrowly defeated lawyer Tim Cullen.

== Ballot measures ==
Five statewide measures were on the ballot in 2014, four of which were approved by the voters.

2014 Arkansas ballot measures
Name	Description	Votes				Type
Name	Description	Yes	%	No	%	Type
Issue 1	Requires legislative review and approval of changes to state agencies' administrative rules.	469,431	59.06	325,396	40.94	Legislatively referred constitutional amendment
Issue 2	Sets threshold of 75 percent of required petition signatures to obtain additional time for signature collection.	425,709	53.31	372,784	46.69	Legislatively referred constitutional amendment
Issue 3	Extends length of time state legislators can stay in office to 16 years; limits lobbying and creates independent elected officials salary commission.	428,206	52.43	388,459	47.57	Legislatively referred constitutional amendment
Issue 4	Legalizes manufacture, transportation and sale of alcohol statewide.	354,446	42.59	477,877	57.41	Citizen-initiated constitutional amendment
Issue 5	Increases the state’s minimum wage from $6.25 to $8.50 per hour by 2017.	548,789	65.94	283,524	34.06	Citizen-initiated state statute
