= Dover High School =

Dover High School can refer to:

- Dover High School (Arkansas)
- Dover High School (Delaware)
- Dover High School (New Hampshire)
- Dover High School (New Jersey)
- Dover High School (Ohio)
