= 2022 Arkansas State Treasurer election =

- November 8, 2022
- Turnout: 50.81%
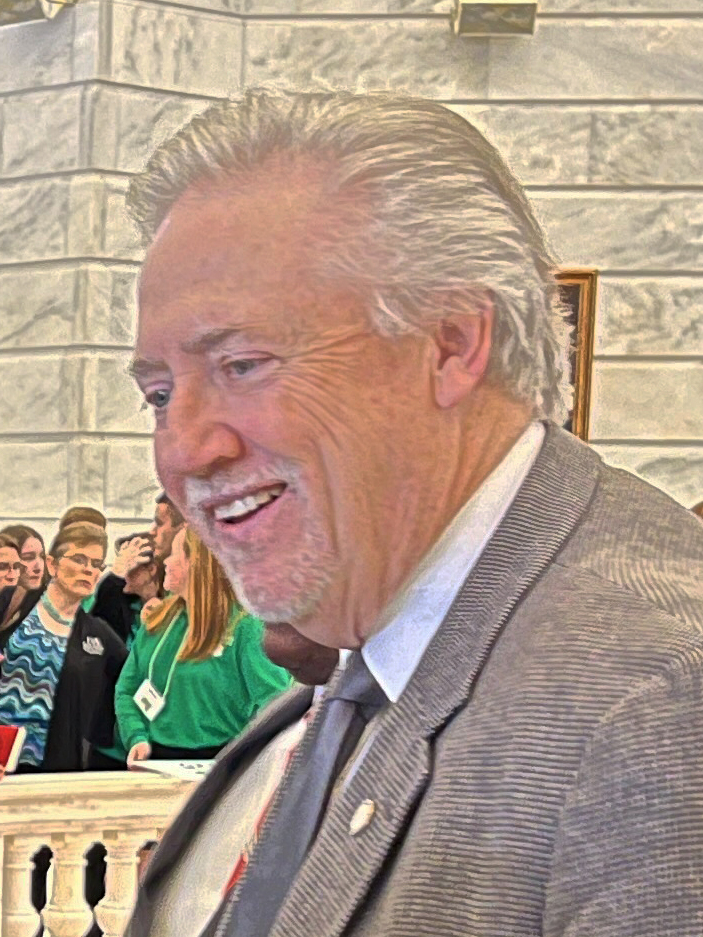

Nominee	Mark Lowery	Pam Whitaker
Party	Republican	Democratic
Popular vote	592,630	301,600
Percentage	66.27%	33.73%
- Lowery: 50–60% 60–70% 70–80% 80–90% Whitaker: 50–60%
State Treasurer before election
Dennis Milligan
Republican
Elected State Treasurer
Mark Lowery
Republican

The 2022 Arkansas State Treasurer election took place on November 8, 2022, to elect the next Arkansas State Treasurer. Incumbent Republican Party Treasurer Dennis Milligan was term-limited and could not seek a third term. Republican candidate Mark Lowery won the general election, defeating Democratic candidate Pam Whitaker.

== Republican primary ==
=== Candidates ===
==== Declared ====
- Mark Lowery, state representative from the 39th district (2013–2023)

===== Eliminated in primary =====
- Mathew Pitsch, state senator from the 8th district

==== Endorsements ====
Mathew Pitsch

Statewide officials

- Dennis Milligan, incumbent state treasurer

=== Polling ===
Poll source	Date(s) administered	Sample size (Note: Key: A – all adults; RV – registered voters; LV – likely voters; V – unclear)	Margin of error	Mark Lowery	Mathew Pitsch	Undecided
Hendrix College	May 2, 2022	802 (LV)	± 4.3%	30%	12%	58%

=== Results ===
Results by county Lowery: 50–60%; 60–70%; 70–80%; 80–90%

Republican primary results
Party	Candidate	Votes	%
Republican	Mark Lowery	239,360	74.82
Republican	Mathew Pitsch	80,565	25.18
Total votes		319,925	100.00

== Democratic nominee ==
- Pam Whitaker, drone services company CEO

== General election ==
=== Endorsements ===
Mark Lowery (R)

Statewide officials

- Dennis Milligan, incumbent state treasurer

=== Results ===
2022 Arkansas state treasurer election
Party	Candidate	Votes	%
Republican	Mark Lowery	592,634	66.27%
Democratic	Pam Whitaker	301,600	33.73%
Total votes		894,234	100.00%
Republican hold			

==== By county ====
County	Mark Lowery Republican		Pam Whitaker Democratic		Margin		Total
County	#	%	#	%	#	%	Total
Arkansas	3,246	73.31%	1,182	26.69%	2,064	46.61%	4,428
Ashley	4,103	75.55%	1,328	24.45%	2,775	51.10%	5,431
Baxter	12,191	78.69%	3,301	21.31%	8,890	57.38%	15,492
Benton	59,672	66.35%	30,265	33.65%	29,407	32.70%	89,937
Boone	10,440	82.71%	2,183	17.29%	8,257	65.41%	12,623
Bradley	1,807	69.71%	785	30.29%	1,022	39.43%	2,592
Calhoun	1,254	79.62%	321	20.38%	933	59.24%	1,575
Carroll	5,936	66.17%	3,035	33.83%	2,901	32.34%	8,971
Chicot	1,590	47.13%	1,784	52.87%	-194	-5.75%	3,374
Clark	3,577	58.96%	2,490	41.04%	1,087	17.92%	6,067
Clay	3,106	79.70%	791	20.30%	2,315	59.40%	3,897
Cleburne	8,457	84.82%	1,514	15.18%	6,943	69.63%	9,971
Cleveland	2,366	85.29%	408	14.71%	1,958	70.58%	2,774
Columbia	4,151	68.90%	1,874	31.10%	2,277	37.79%	6,025
Conway	4,556	68.68%	2,078	31.32%	2,478	37.35%	6,634
Craighead	18,920	69.07%	8,474	30.93%	10,446	38.13%	27,394
Crawford	13,932	79.63%	3,563	20.37%	10,369	59.27%	17,495
Crittenden	5,408	50.99%	5,199	49.01%	209	1.97%	10,607
Cross	3,738	76.24%	1,165	23.76%	2,573	52.48%	4,903
Dallas	1,350	65.82%	701	34.18%	649	31.64%	2,051
Desha	1,572	53.43%	1,370	46.57%	202	6.87%	2,942
Drew	3,397	65.15%	1,817	34.85%	1,580	30.30%	5,214
Faulkner	26,962	67.60%	12,922	32.40%	14,040	35.20%	39,884
Franklin	4,234	79.62%	1,084	20.38%	3,150	59.23%	5,318
Fulton	3,160	80.59%	761	19.41%	2,399	61.18%	3,921
Garland	22,581	69.06%	10,116	30.94%	12,465	38.12%	32,697
Grant	5,274	84.45%	971	15.55%	4,303	68.90%	6,245
Greene	9,284	80.93%	2,188	19.07%	7,096	61.85%	11,472
Hempstead	3,389	73.02%	1,252	26.98%	2,137	46.05%	4,641
Hot Spring	7,359	75.78%	2,352	24.22%	5,007	51.56%	9,711
Howard	2,682	74.09%	938	25.91%	1,744	48.18%	3,620
Independence	8,240	79.26%	2,156	20.74%	6,084	58.52%	10,396
Izard	3,737	82.13%	813	17.87%	2,924	64.26%	4,550
Jackson	2,941	73.43%	1,064	26.57%	1,877	46.87%	4,005
Jefferson	7,216	42.36%	9,819	57.64%	-2,603	-15.28%	17,035
Johnson	5,208	75.10%	1,727	24.90%	3,481	50.19%	6,935
Lafayette	1,300	66.84%	645	33.16%	655	33.68%	1,945
Lawrence	3,718	81.57%	840	18.43%	2,878	63.14%	4,558
Lee	969	48.99%	1,009	51.01%	-40	-2.02%	1,978
Lincoln	2,041	74.79%	688	25.21%	1,353	49.58%	2,729
Little River	2,908	77.20%	859	22.80%	2,049	54.39%	3,767
Logan	5,029	80.74%	1,200	19.26%	3,829	61.47%	6,229
Lonoke	17,246	77.62%	4,973	22.38%	12,273	55.24%	22,219
Madison	4,420	77.65%	1,272	22.35%	3,148	55.31%	5,692
Marion	4,815	81.03%	1,127	18.97%	3,688	62.07%	5,942
Miller	8,634	77.14%	2,559	22.86%	6,075	54.27%	11,193
Mississippi	5,422	64.01%	3,049	35.99%	2,373	28.01%	8,471
Monroe	1,247	57.15%	935	42.85%	312	14.30%	2,182
Montgomery	2,552	81.38%	584	18.62%	1,968	62.76%	3,136
Nevada	1,655	67.83%	785	32.17%	870	35.66%	2,440
Newton	2,469	81.51%	560	18.49%	1,909	63.02%	3,029
Ouachita	4,139	59.48%	2,820	40.52%	1,319	18.95%	6,959
Perry	2,922	78.09%	820	21.91%	2,102	56.17%	3,742
Phillips	1,921	46.05%	2,251	53.95%	-330	-7.91%	4,172
Pike	3,156	85.78%	523	14.22%	2,633	71.57%	3,679
Poinsett	4,451	80.65%	1,068	19.35%	3,383	61.30%	5,519
Polk	5,815	85.00%	1,026	15.00%	4,789	70.00%	6,841
Pope	13,328	76.97%	3,987	23.03%	9,341	53.95%	17,315
Prairie	2,205	83.24%	444	16.76%	1,761	66.48%	2,649
Pulaski	50,596	41.39%	71,643	58.61%	-21,047	-17.22%	122,239
Randolph	4,222	80.40%	1,029	19.60%	3,193	60.81%	5,251
Saline	31,093	72.66%	11,699	27.34%	19,394	45.32%	42,792
Scott	2,499	86.08%	404	13.92%	2,095	72.17%	2,903
Searcy	2,589	84.83%	463	15.17%	2,126	69.66%	3,052
Sebastian	23,478	69.77%	10,172	30.23%	13,306	39.54%	33,650
Sevier	2,947	81.63%	663	18.37%	2,284	63.27%	3,610
Sharp	4,927	82.41%	1,052	17.59%	3,875	64.81%	5,979
St. Francis	2,537	50.47%	2,490	49.53%	47	0.93%	5,027
Stone	3,917	78.70%	1,060	21.30%	2,857	57.40%	4,977
Union	8,011	69.31%	3,548	30.69%	4,463	38.61%	11,559
Van Buren	4,894	79.69%	1,247	20.31%	3,647	59.39%	6,141
Washington	37,251	53.45%	32,448	46.55%	4,803	6.89%	69,699
White	18,641	81.54%	4,221	18.46%	14,420	63.07%	22,862
Woodruff	1,358	65.86%	704	34.14%	654	31.72%	2,062
Yell	4,276	81.95%	942	18.05%	3,334	63.89%	5,218
Totals	592,634	66.27%	301,600	33.73%	291,034	32.55%	894,234

Counties that flipped from Republican to Democratic

- Chicot (largest city: Dermott)
- Jefferson (largest city: Pine Bluff)
- Lee (largest city: Marianna)
- Phillips (largest city: Helena-West Helena)
- Pulaski (largest city: Little Rock)

==== By congressional district ====
Lowery won all four congressional districts.

District	Lowery	Whitaker	Representative
1st	73%	27%	Rick Crawford
2nd	59%	41%	French Hill
3rd	64%	36%	Steve Womack
4th	70%	30%	Bruce Westerman
