= 2022 Arkansas State Auditor election =

- November 8, 2022
Nominee	Dennis Milligan	Diamond Arnold-Johnson
Party	Republican	Democratic
Popular vote	595,166	258,154
Percentage	66.79%	28.97%
- Milligan: 40–50% 50–60% 60–70% 70–80% 80–90% Arnold-Johnson: 40–50% 50–60%
State Auditor before election
Andrea Lea
Republican
Elected State Auditor
Dennis Milligan
Republican

The 2022 Arkansas State Auditor election was held on November 8, 2022, to elect the Arkansas State Auditor. The election coincided with various other federal and state elections, including for governor of Arkansas. Primary elections were held on May 24.

Incumbent Republican State Auditor Andrea Lea was barred by the Constitution of Arkansas from running for a third term. Republican State Treasurer Dennis Milligan handily defeated Democrat Diamond Arnold-Johnson. Notably, Pulaski County, home to Little Rock, only voted for the Democratic nominee by a 4.8% margin. This could be attributed to Arnold-Johnson being arrested on a felony charge of "terroristic threatening" eleven days before election day.

== Republican primary ==
=== Candidates ===
==== Nominee ====
- Dennis Milligan, state treasurer (2015–2023)

== Democratic primary ==
=== Candidates ===
==== Nominee ====
- Diamond Arnold-Johnson, insurance advisor

== Libertarian primary ==
=== Candidates ===
==== Nominee ====
- Simeon Snow, tax specialist

== General election ==
=== Results ===
2022 Arkansas State Auditor election
Party	Candidate	Votes	%
Republican	Dennis Milligan	595,166	66.79%
Democratic	Diamond Arnold-Johnson	258,154	28.97%
Libertarian	Simeon Snow	37,825	4.24%
Total votes		891,145	100.00%
Republican hold			

==== By county ====
County	Dennis Milligan Republican		Diamond Arnold-Johnson Democratic		Simeon Snow Libertarian		Margin		Total
County	#	%	#	%	#	%	#	%	Total
Arkansas	3,309	74.85%	988	22.35%	124	2.80%	2,321	52.50%	4,421
Ashley	4,090	75.41%	1,229	22.66%	105	1.94%	2,861	52.75%	5,424
Baxter	12,118	78.23%	2,835	18.30%	538	3.47%	9,283	59.93%	15,491
Benton	59,374	66.45%	25,481	28.52%	4,498	5.03%	33,893	37.93%	89,353
Boone	10,194	80.81%	1,936	15.35%	485	3.84%	8,258	65.46%	12,615
Bradley	1,800	69.52%	730	28.20%	59	2.28%	1,070	41.33%	2,589
Calhoun	1,234	78.60%	300	19.11%	36	2.29%	934	59.49%	1,570
Carroll	5,817	64.99%	2,712	30.30%	421	4.70%	3,105	34.69%	8,950
Chicot	1,615	47.87%	1,713	50.77%	46	1.36%	-98	-2.90%	3,374
Clark	3,594	60.30%	2,158	36.21%	208	3.49%	1,436	24.09%	5,960
Clay	2,946	75.65%	656	16.85%	292	7.50%	2,290	58.81%	3,894
Cleburne	8,407	84.49%	1,238	12.44%	305	3.07%	7,169	72.05%	9,950
Cleveland	2,312	84.47%	376	13.74%	49	1.79%	1,936	70.73%	2,737
Columbia	4,132	68.71%	1,743	28.98%	139	2.31%	2,389	39.72%	6,014
Conway	4,543	68.62%	1,811	27.35%	267	4.03%	2,732	41.26%	6,621
Craighead	18,961	69.38%	7,226	26.44%	1,143	4.18%	11,735	42.94%	27,330
Crawford	13,839	79.07%	2,867	16.38%	796	4.55%	10,972	62.69%	17,502
Crittenden	5,379	50.72%	4,984	47.00%	242	2.28%	395	3.72%	10,605
Cross	3,682	75.20%	1,048	21.41%	166	3.39%	2,634	53.80%	4,896
Dallas	1,330	65.55%	636	31.35%	63	3.10%	694	34.20%	2,029
Desha	1,641	55.53%	1,240	41.96%	74	2.50%	401	13.57%	2,955
Drew	3,505	67.24%	1,540	29.54%	168	3.22%	1,965	37.69%	5,213
Faulkner	27,084	68.16%	10,873	27.36%	1,781	4.48%	16,211	40.79%	39,738
Franklin	4,196	79.18%	915	17.27%	188	3.55%	3,281	61.92%	5,299
Fulton	3,079	78.67%	678	17.32%	157	4.01%	2,401	61.34%	3,914
Garland	22,988	70.46%	8,364	25.64%	1,273	3.90%	14,624	44.82%	32,625
Grant	5,236	83.78%	798	12.77%	216	3.46%	4,438	71.01%	6,250
Greene	9,147	79.82%	1,833	15.99%	480	4.19%	7,314	63.82%	11,460
Hempstead	3,358	72.72%	1,164	25.21%	96	2.08%	2,194	47.51%	4,618
Hot Spring	7,365	75.66%	1,994	20.48%	375	3.85%	5,371	55.18%	9,734
Howard	2,642	73.25%	863	23.93%	102	2.83%	1,779	49.32%	3,607
Independence	8,353	80.13%	1,697	16.28%	374	3.59%	6,656	63.85%	10,424
Izard	3,681	81.26%	699	15.43%	150	3.31%	2,982	65.83%	4,530
Jackson	2,950	74.16%	923	23.20%	105	2.64%	2,027	50.96%	3,978
Jefferson	7,322	43.36%	8,977	53.16%	587	3.48%	-1,655	-9.80%	16,886
Johnson	5,179	74.96%	1,426	20.64%	304	4.40%	3,753	54.32%	6,909
Lafayette	1,290	66.77%	595	30.80%	47	2.43%	695	35.97%	1,932
Lawrence	3,671	80.28%	763	16.68%	139	3.04%	2,908	63.59%	4,573
Lee	976	49.69%	960	48.88%	28	1.43%	16	0.81%	1,964
Lincoln	2,040	75.08%	608	22.38%	69	2.54%	1,432	52.71%	2,717
Little River	2,858	75.93%	787	20.91%	119	3.16%	2,071	55.02%	3,764
Logan	4,932	79.17%	1,022	16.40%	276	4.43%	3,910	62.76%	6,230
Lonoke	17,249	77.71%	3,931	17.71%	1,018	4.59%	13,318	60.00%	22,198
Madison	4,386	76.95%	1,078	18.91%	236	4.14%	3,308	58.04%	5,700
Marion	4,733	79.71%	965	16.25%	240	4.04%	3,768	63.46%	5,938
Miller	8,565	76.43%	2,377	21.21%	265	2.36%	6,188	55.22%	11,207
Mississippi	5,358	63.57%	2,872	34.08%	198	2.35%	2,486	29.50%	8,428
Monroe	1,220	55.94%	901	41.31%	60	2.75%	319	14.63%	2,181
Montgomery	2,561	81.38%	482	15.32%	104	3.30%	2,079	66.06%	3,147
Nevada	1,681	68.98%	714	29.30%	42	1.72%	967	39.68%	2,437
Newton	2,459	80.78%	482	15.83%	103	3.38%	1,977	64.95%	3,044
Ouachita	4,194	60.30%	2,591	37.25%	170	2.44%	1,603	23.05%	6,955
Perry	2,913	78.31%	668	17.96%	139	3.74%	2,245	60.35%	3,720
Phillips	1,849	44.76%	2,194	53.11%	88	2.13%	-345	-8.35%	4,131
Pike	3,136	85.36%	449	12.22%	89	2.42%	2,687	73.14%	3,674
Poinsett	4,353	79.10%	990	17.99%	160	2.91%	3,363	61.11%	5,503
Polk	5,657	82.74%	896	13.11%	284	4.15%	4,761	69.64%	6,837
Pope	13,311	76.88%	3,324	19.20%	680	3.93%	9,987	57.68%	17,315
Prairie	2,175	82.86%	383	14.59%	67	2.55%	1,792	68.27%	2,625
Pulaski	54,270	44.78%	60,035	49.53%	6,893	5.69%	-5,765	-4.76%	121,198
Randolph	4,206	80.27%	814	15.53%	220	4.20%	3,392	64.73%	5,240
Saline	30,985	73.08%	9,196	21.69%	2,216	5.23%	21,789	51.39%	42,397
Scott	2,448	84.56%	352	12.16%	95	3.28%	2,096	72.40%	2,895
Searcy	2,577	83.53%	399	12.93%	109	3.53%	2,178	70.60%	3,085
Sebastian	23,886	70.59%	8,520	25.18%	1,431	4.23%	15,366	45.41%	33,837
Sevier	2,902	80.52%	610	16.93%	92	2.55%	2,292	63.60%	3,604
Sharp	4,893	81.48%	911	15.17%	201	3.35%	3,982	66.31%	6,005
St. Francis	2,503	50.16%	2,331	46.71%	156	3.13%	172	3.45%	4,990
Stone	3,923	78.23%	881	17.57%	211	4.21%	3,042	60.66%	5,015
Union	7,861	68.27%	3,332	28.94%	321	2.79%	4,529	39.33%	11,514
Van Buren	4,916	79.62%	1,010	16.36%	248	4.02%	3,906	63.27%	6,174
Washington	37,568	54.12%	28,293	40.76%	3,555	5.12%	9,275	13.36%	69,416
White	18,627	81.59%	3,389	14.84%	814	3.57%	15,238	66.75%	22,830
Woodruff	1,360	66.47%	613	29.96%	73	3.57%	747	36.51%	2,046
Yell	4,272	81.93%	785	15.06%	157	3.01%	3,487	66.88%	5,214
Totals	595,166	66.79%	258,154	28.97%	37,825	4.24%	337,012	37.82%	891,145

Counties that flipped from Republican to Democratic

- Chicot (largest city: Dermott)
- Jefferson (largest city: Pine Bluff)
- Phillips (largest city: Helena-West Helena)
- Pulaski (largest city: Little Rock)

==== By congressional district ====
Milligan won all four congressional districts.

District	Milligan	Arnold-Johnson	Representative
1st	72%	24%	Rick Crawford
2nd	61%	34%	French Hill
3rd	64%	31%	Steve Womack
4th	71%	26%	Bruce Westerman

== See also ==
- 2022 Arkansas elections
