= Joshua P. Bryant =

American politician

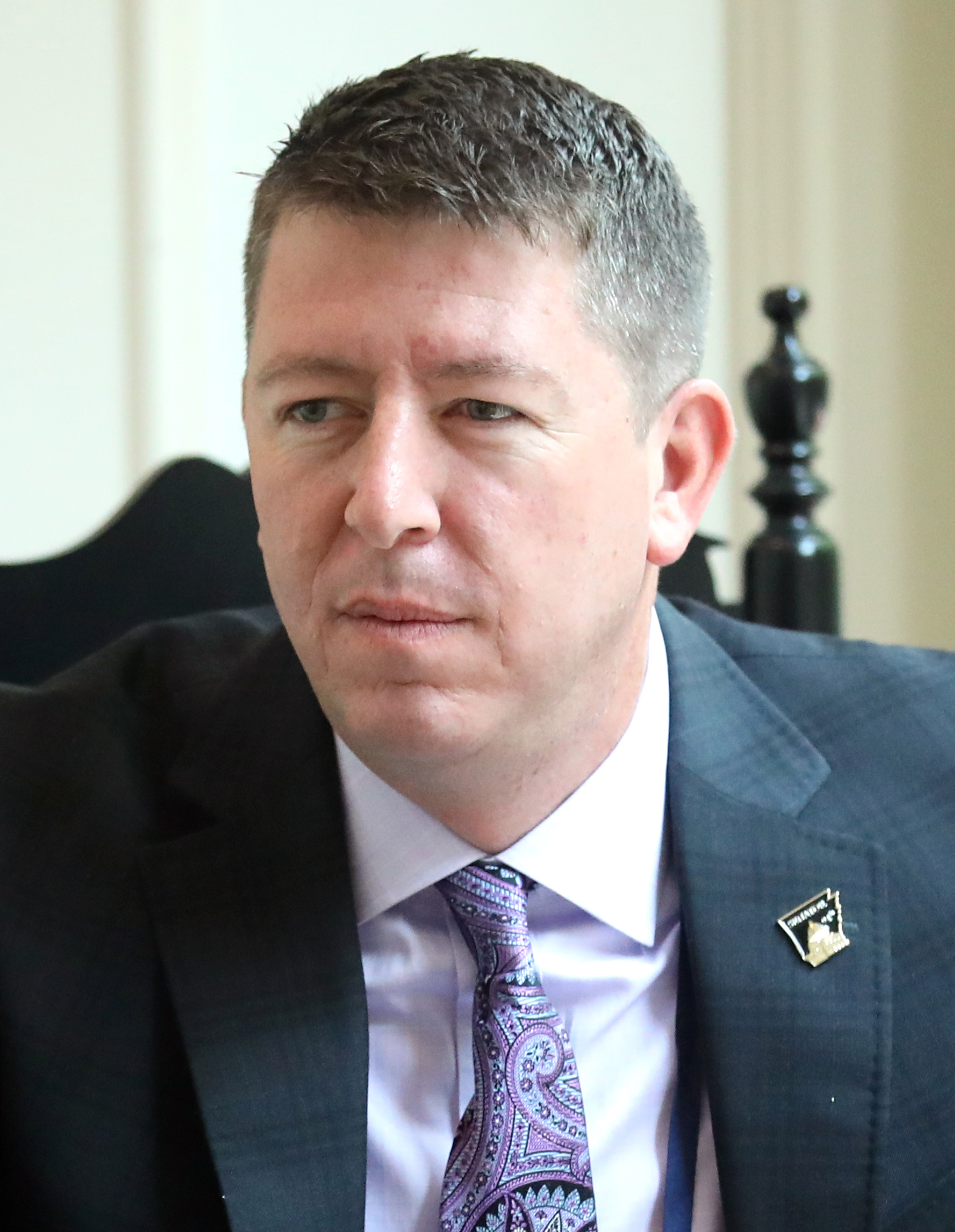

Member of the Arkansas Senate from the 32nd district
- Incumbent
- Assumed office January 9, 2023
- Preceded by: Clarke Tucker

Member of the Arkansas House of Representatives from the 96th district
- In office January 11, 2021 – January 9, 2023
- Preceded by: Jill Bryant
- Succeeded by: Sonia Eubanks Barker

Personal details
- Party: Republican

Joshua P. Bryant is an American politician. He serves as a Republican member for the 32nd district of the Arkansas Senate. He also served as a member for the 96th district of the Arkansas House of Representatives.

== Life and career ==
Bryant was a justice of the peace in Benton County, Arkansas.

In 2020, Bryant was elected to represent the 96th district of the Arkansas House of Representatives, succeeding his wife, Jill Bryant. He served until 2022, when he sought election to the Arkansas Senate.

In May 2022, Bryant defeated Jim Tull in the Republican primary election for the 32nd district of the Arkansas Senate. No candidate was nominated to challenge him in the general election. He was seated January 9, 2023 in the 94th Arkansas General Assembly.
