= Jill Bryant =

Jill Carney Bryant is a former member of the Arkansas House of Representatives, briefly serving in 2020 and 2021.

Following the resignation of representative Grant Hodges on July 10, 2020, Bryant, a political newcomer, ran for the Arkansas House of Representatives 96th district in the special election (which was November 3, 2020), while her husband, Joshua P. Bryant, ran in the general election (also on November 3, 2020). Mrs. Bryant, a Republican, was easily elected in the special election, receiving more than 10,000 votes and having no opposition. She was sworn in on November 23, 2020, and left office on January 11, 2021. She was succeeded by her husband, who won the general election. She only served in the chamber for 49 days.
