= Greg Standridge =

American politician

Member of the Arkansas Senate from the 16th district
- In office April 2015 – November 16, 2017
- Preceded by: Michael Lamoureux
- Succeeded by: Breanne Davis

Personal details
- Born: May 6, 1967 Russellville, Arkansas, U.S.
- Died: November 16, 2017 (aged 50) Russellville, Arkansas, U.S.
- Party: Republican
- Spouse: Karen Sue Standridge
- Children: 4
- Education: Arkansas Tech University (BBA)

Gregory Brian Standridge (May 6, 1967 – November 16, 2017) was an American politician who served as a Republican member of the Arkansas State Senate for District 16, which includes Newton and Pope counties and parts of Boone, Carroll and Van Buren counties in the northern portion of his state.

== Early life and education ==
Standridge graduated from Russellville High School and earned a Bachelor of Business Administration degree in 1987 from Arkansas Tech University in Russellville.

== Career ==
Standridge won a low-turnout special runoff election held on February 10, 2015, to succeed fellow Republican Michael Lamoureux, who resigned in November 2014 to become chief of staff in the new state administration of Governor Asa Hutchinson. Standridge defeated fellow Republican Stan J. Berry, 2,675 votes (53.6 percent) to 2,313 (46.4 percent).

Though he was elected in mid-February, Standridge was not allowed to fill the vacant Senate seat until April 2015.

== Personal life ==
He and his wife, Karen Sue Flegel Standridge (born c. 1966), had four children. Standridge died of cancer at the age of 50.
