= 2018 Arkansas State Treasurer election =

- November 6, 2018
Nominee	Dennis Milligan	Ashley Ewald
Party	Republican	Libertarian
Popular vote	611,189	250,943
Percentage	70.89%	29.11%
- Milligan: 50–60% 60–70% 70–80% 80–90%
State Treasurer before election
Dennis Milligan
Republican
Elected State Treasurer
Dennis Milligan
Republican

The 2018 Arkansas State Treasurer election was held on November 6, 2018, to elect the Arkansas State Treasurer. The election coincided with various other federal and state elections, including for governor of Arkansas.

Incumbent Republican State Treasurer Dennis Milligan was re-elected to a second term in office, defeating Libertarian challenger Ashley Ewald in a landslide.

== Republican primary ==
=== Candidates ===
==== Nominee ====
- Dennis Milligan, incumbent state treasurer (2015–2023)

== Libertarian primary ==
=== Candidates ===
==== Nominee ====
- Ashley Ewald

== General election ==
=== Results ===
2018 Arkansas State Treasurer election
Party	Candidate	Votes	%
Republican	Dennis Milligan (incumbent)	611,189	70.89%
Libertarian	Ashley Ewald	250,943	29.11%
Total votes		862,132	100.00%
Republican hold			

==== By county ====
County	Dennis Milligan Republican		Ashley Ewald Libertarian		Margin		Total
County	#	%	#	%	#	%	Total
Arkansas	3,761	77.28%	1,106	22.72%	2,655	54.55%	4,867
Ashley	4,473	73.52%	1,611	26.48%	2,862	47.04%	6,084
Baxter	11,022	80.68%	2,639	19.32%	8,383	61.36%	13,661
Benton	55,272	73.18%	20,253	26.82%	35,019	46.37%	75,525
Boone	9,481	82.82%	1,967	17.18%	7,514	65.64%	11,448
Bradley	1,908	70.43%	801	29.57%	1,107	40.86%	2,709
Calhoun	1,388	79.68%	354	20.32%	1,034	59.36%	1,742
Carroll	6,070	68.95%	2,734	31.05%	3,336	37.89%	8,804
Chicot	1,816	53.30%	1,591	46.70%	225	6.60%	3,407
Clark	4,269	64.67%	2,332	35.33%	1,937	29.34%	6,601
Clay	3,269	80.66%	784	19.34%	2,485	61.31%	4,053
Cleburne	8,139	85.16%	1,418	14.84%	6,721	70.33%	9,557
Cleveland	2,124	82.55%	449	17.45%	1,675	65.10%	2,573
Columbia	4,431	72.57%	1,675	27.43%	2,756	45.14%	6,106
Conway	4,574	73.56%	1,644	26.44%	2,930	47.12%	6,218
Craighead	19,046	74.36%	6,568	25.64%	12,478	48.72%	25,614
Crawford	13,542	81.21%	3,134	18.79%	10,408	62.41%	16,676
Crittenden	6,310	54.87%	5,189	45.13%	1,121	9.75%	11,499
Cross	4,465	77.86%	1,270	22.14%	3,195	55.71%	5,735
Dallas	1,403	68.24%	653	31.76%	750	36.48%	2,056
Desha	1,946	61.06%	1,241	38.94%	705	22.12%	3,187
Drew	3,720	72.56%	1,407	27.44%	2,313	45.11%	5,127
Faulkner	26,861	71.50%	10,709	28.50%	16,152	42.99%	37,570
Franklin	4,306	82.46%	916	17.54%	3,390	64.92%	5,222
Fulton	2,920	80.64%	701	19.36%	2,219	61.28%	3,621
Garland	22,714	73.25%	8,295	26.75%	14,419	46.50%	31,009
Grant	4,623	83.70%	900	16.30%	3,723	67.41%	5,523
Greene	8,911	82.20%	1,930	17.80%	6,981	64.39%	10,841
Hempstead	3,540	73.43%	1,281	26.57%	2,259	46.86%	4,821
Hot Spring	6,660	77.19%	1,968	22.81%	4,692	54.38%	8,628
Howard	2,624	76.15%	822	23.85%	1,802	52.29%	3,446
Independence	8,329	82.95%	1,712	17.05%	6,617	65.90%	10,041
Izard	3,685	83.43%	732	16.57%	2,953	66.86%	4,417
Jackson	3,151	76.72%	956	23.28%	2,195	53.45%	4,107
Jefferson	9,955	54.55%	8,295	45.45%	1,660	9.10%	18,250
Johnson	5,810	78.64%	1,578	21.36%	4,232	57.28%	7,388
Lafayette	1,481	72.10%	573	27.90%	908	44.21%	2,054
Lawrence	3,690	80.20%	911	19.80%	2,779	60.40%	4,601
Lee	1,037	52.37%	943	47.63%	94	4.75%	1,980
Lincoln	2,167	76.30%	673	23.70%	1,494	52.61%	2,840
Little River	2,899	74.72%	981	25.28%	1,918	49.43%	3,880
Logan	4,467	81.68%	1,002	18.32%	3,465	63.36%	5,469
Lonoke	16,345	80.16%	4,045	19.84%	12,300	60.32%	20,390
Madison	4,295	80.76%	1,023	19.24%	3,272	61.53%	5,318
Marion	4,095	80.80%	973	19.20%	3,122	61.60%	5,068
Miller	8,590	76.18%	2,686	23.82%	5,904	52.36%	11,276
Mississippi	6,674	67.26%	3,249	32.74%	3,425	34.52%	9,923
Monroe	1,520	60.51%	992	39.49%	528	21.02%	2,512
Montgomery	2,284	81.40%	522	18.60%	1,762	62.79%	2,806
Nevada	1,712	70.08%	731	29.92%	981	40.16%	2,443
Newton	2,410	80.79%	573	19.21%	1,837	61.58%	2,983
Ouachita	4,481	62.93%	2,640	37.07%	1,841	25.85%	7,121
Perry	2,833	77.74%	811	22.26%	2,022	55.49%	3,644
Phillips	2,660	53.45%	2,317	46.55%	343	6.89%	4,977
Pike	2,825	85.76%	469	14.24%	2,356	71.52%	3,294
Poinsett	4,783	80.01%	1,195	19.99%	3,588	60.02%	5,978
Polk	5,063	84.44%	933	15.56%	4,130	68.88%	5,996
Pope	14,365	80.79%	3,415	19.21%	10,950	61.59%	17,780
Prairie	2,282	81.94%	503	18.06%	1,779	63.88%	2,785
Pulaski	67,555	53.58%	58,531	46.42%	9,024	7.16%	126,086
Randolph	4,456	80.43%	1,084	19.57%	3,372	60.87%	5,540
Saline	29,925	74.10%	10,457	25.90%	19,468	48.21%	40,382
Scott	2,367	84.48%	435	15.52%	1,932	68.95%	2,802
Searcy	2,594	85.50%	440	14.50%	2,154	71.00%	3,034
Sebastian	24,587	75.15%	8,131	24.85%	16,456	50.30%	32,718
Sevier	2,575	81.31%	592	18.69%	1,983	62.61%	3,167
Sharp	4,609	82.05%	1,008	17.95%	3,601	64.11%	5,617
St. Francis	3,098	57.34%	2,305	42.66%	793	14.68%	5,403
Stone	3,513	81.56%	794	18.44%	2,719	63.13%	4,307
Union	8,268	71.20%	3,345	28.80%	4,923	42.39%	11,613
Van Buren	4,881	79.43%	1,264	20.57%	3,617	58.86%	6,145
Washington	39,511	62.68%	23,528	37.32%	15,983	25.35%	63,039
White	18,113	83.21%	3,655	16.79%	14,458	66.42%	21,768
Woodruff	1,378	69.11%	616	30.89%	762	38.21%	1,994
Yell	4,283	81.33%	983	18.67%	3,300	62.67%	5,266
Totals	611,189	70.89%	250,943	29.11%	360,246	41.79%	862,132

Counties that flipped from Democratic to Libertarian

- Chicot (largest municipality: Dermott)
- Clark (largest municipality: Arkadelphia)
- Crittenden (largest municipality: West Memphis)
- Desha (largest municipality: Dumas)
- Jefferson (largest municipality: Pine Bluff)
- Lee (largest municipality: Marianna)
- Mississippi (largest municipality: Blytheville)
- Monroe (largest municipality: Brinkley)
- Ouachita (largest municipality: Camden)
- Phillips (largest municipality: Helena–West Helena)
- Pulaski (largest municipality: Little Rock)
- St. Francis (largest municipality: Forrest City)
- Woodruff (largest municipality: Augusta)

== See also ==
- 2018 Arkansas elections
