= Duncan Baird =

American politician

Member of the Arkansas House of Representatives from the 95th district
- In office January 2009 – January 2013
- Preceded by: Keven Anderson
- Succeeded by: Sue Scott

Member of the Arkansas House of Representatives from the 96th district
- In office January 2013 – January 2015
- Preceded by: Debra Hobbs
- Succeeded by: Grant Hodges

Personal details
- Born: 1979 (age 46–47) Place of birth missing
- Party: Republican
- Spouse: Courtney Baird
- Education: Siloam Springs High School; University of Arkansas
- Occupation: Arkansas State Budget Director since 2015

Duncan Baird (born 1979) was the Budget Director for Governor Asa Hutchinson of Arkansas. He was elected to the Arkansas House of Representatives in 2008, a position which he held until he was term limited in 2015. As a legislator, Baird served as the House chairman of the Joint Budget Committee, the first Republican in that position since Reconstruction, and at the age of thirty-four was the highest ranking House member based on seniority. He was previously employed as a securities trader for Arvest Bank in Lowell in Benton County in Northwest Arkansas.

== Early years and education ==
Baird graduated in 1998 from Siloam Springs High School in Siloam Springs in Benton County and holds bachelor's degrees in finance and accounting from the University of Arkansas at Fayetteville at Fayetteville. He is a Southern Baptist and attends Cross Church in Benton County. His wife is Courtney Baird.

== Early career ==
After graduation, Baird pursued a career in finance and investments in Northwest Arkansas. He was a securities trader for Arvest Bank in Lowell, where he held both the Series 7 general securities license and the Series 66 state securities license.

== Political career ==
=== 2008 Campaign for State Representative ===
As a 28-year-old political newcomer, Baird entered the Republican Primary for State Representative against Linda Bisbee, the wife of 14-year incumbent State Senator Dave Bisbee. Baird ran an aggressive grassroots campaign and defeated Bisbee by a margin of 1,598 (52.69%) to 1,435 (47.31%). He was unopposed in the November general election.

=== Tenure in the Arkansas House of Representatives ===
Baird is known for his knowledge of the state budget and his work on ethics and government reform. As a legislator, he followed a no-gift rule, refusing to take even a cup of coffee from a lobbyist. He worked to establish a cooling-off period before a legislator, constitutional officer, or state agency head could become a lobbyist. In addition to serving as chairman of the Joint Budget Committee, Baird was a member of the House committees on Revenue & Taxation and State Agencies & Governmental Affairs. Prior to the 2013 legislative session, Baird was named one of the "Top 10 Legislators To Watch" by Talk Business.

Baird served as a delegate to the 2012 Republican National Convention from Arkansas for Mitt Romney. He was a member of the Budget and Revenue Committee of the National Conference of State Legislatures.

Grant Hodges of Rogers was the successful Republican nominee to succeed Baird in House District 96. In the May 2014 Republican primary, Rogers polled 1,392 votes (69 percent) to intraparty rival Damon Dale Wallace's 635 votes (31 percent). Hodges then defeated Democratic and Libertarian opponents in the November 4 general election.

=== 2014 campaign for state treasurer ===
In 2013, Baird announce his candidacy for state treasurer, an office formerly held by the Democrat Martha Shoffner, who stepped down in 2013 amid charges of corruption and was replaced by the temporary appointee, Charles W. Robinson. "My primary focus as State Treasurer will be to restore trust to the office. I want the people of Arkansas to be able to look at the treasurer’s office and have confidence that we’re working on behalf of them to do what’s best for the state," said Baird in a statement of candidacy.

Baird earned the endorsement of the statewide Arkansas Democrat-Gazette, which said, "Duncan Baird is the obvious choice in this Republican primary", as well as the Northwest Arkansas Newspapers. Conservative columnist Jason Tolbert endorsed Baird, saying, "In short, Baird is qualified, well-respected, understands state government, has the investment experience needed, and most importantly has the high ethical standards that inspire trust. He is clearly the man for such a time as this."

He was also endorsed by the NRA Political Victory Fund, which gave him an "A" rating for his support of the 2nd Amendment, and he received a 100% rating from the National Federation of Independent Business for his votes on small business issues.

Baird was defeated by Dennis Milligan, 53-47 percent, in the Republican primary election on May 20, 2014.

Preceded by Keven Anderson	Arkansas State Representative for District 95 (Benton County); 2009–2013	Succeeded by Sue Scott
Preceded by Debra Hobbs	Arkansas State Representative for District 96 (Benton County); 2013–2015	Succeeded by Grant Hodges
