= Nik and Sam =

- Origin: Dover, Arkansas, US
- Genres: Country
- Website: http://www.NikandSam.com

Nik and Sam (born April 29, 1992, in Dover, Arkansas) are a country music duo that has been playing since the early age of ten. The girls began playing shows throughout the Southern United States. Word of mouth eventually brought the girls out west to Los Angeles in further pursuit of their music careers. They were signed to a record development deal with Warner Music.

Nikki and Samantha Setian are twin sisters; Sam is older by 22 minutes.one sister has brown hair and the other has blonde Nik is lead vocalist and guitarist, while Sam plays banjo and Dobro resonator guitar, and sings harmonies and occasionally lead. Their father Richard has played in their backing band. They were featured in the popular series, "The Beacon Street Girls" playing the main characters' favorite singers in the book "Ghost Town".
