= Uvalde Lindsey =

American politician (1940–2025)

Member of the Arkansas Senate from the 4th district
- In office January 14, 2013 – January 14, 2019
- Preceded by: Sharon Trusty
- Succeeded by: Greg Leding

Member of the Arkansas House of Representatives from the 88th district
- In office January 2009 – January 14, 2013
- Preceded by: Marilyn Edwards
- Succeeded by: Randy Alexander

Personal details
- Born: January 17, 1940 Harrison, Arkansas, U.S.
- Died: July 19, 2025 (aged 85)
- Party: Democratic
- Education: University of Arkansas
- Website: uvaldelindsey.com

Military service
- Branch/service: United States Army Reserve
- Rank: First Lieutenant

Uvalde Rex Lindsey (January 17, 1940 – July 19, 2025) was an American politician and Democratic member of the Arkansas Senate representing District 4 from January 14, 2013, until January 14, 2019. Lindsey served consecutively in the Arkansas General Assembly from January 2009 until January 2013 in the Arkansas House of Representatives District 88 seat.

== Education ==
Lindsey earned his BSBA from the University of Arkansas.

== Death ==
Lindsey died July 19, 2025, at the age of 85.

== Elections ==
- 2012 With Senate District 4 Senator Sharon Trusty retired and left the seat open, Lindsey was unopposed for both the May 22, 2012 Democratic Primary and the November 6, 2012 General election.
- 2008 Initially in House District 88, when Representative Marilyn Edwards left the Legislature and left the seat open, Lindsey was unopposed for both the May 20, 2008 Democratic Primary and the November 4, 2008 General election.
- 2010 Lindsey was unopposed for both the May 18, 2010 Democratic Primary and the November 2, 2010 General election.
