= Kenneth Henderson =

American politician

Member of the Arkansas House of Representatives from the 71st district
- In office January 2015 – 2019
- Preceded by: Andrea Lea
- Succeeded by: Joe Cloud

Personal details
- Born: Kenneth Lee Henderson
- Party: Republican
- Spouse: Laurie Henderson
- Children: 2
- Education: University of Arkansas at Little Rock

Kenneth Lee Henderson is an American politician. He served as a Republican member for the 71st district of the Arkansas House of Representatives.

Henderson attended Benton High School and the University of Arkansas at Little Rock, where he earned a Bachelor of Science degree in finance. In 2015, Henderson won the election for the 71st district of the Arkansas House of Representatives. He succeeded Andrea Lea. Henderson was succeeded by Joe Cloud for the 71st district in 2019. He has been vice president for the company Commercial Lending, and worked as a real estate developer in Russellville, Arkansas.
