= Marilyn Edwards =

American politician (1938–2026)

Member of the Arkansas House of Representatives from the 88th district
- In office January 13, 2003 – January 12, 2009
- Preceded by: Bobby Lee Trammell
- Succeeded by: Uvalde Lindsey

Personal details
- Born: August 24, 1938 Hartman, Arkansas, U.S.
- Died: September 10, 2026 (aged 88) Springdale, Washington, U.S.
- Party: Democratic

Marilyn Edwards (August 24, 1938 – September 10, 2026) was an American politician who served the 88th district in the Arkansas House of Representatives from 2003 to 2009. Between 1968 and 2016, she was a Washington County employee, clerk and judge. She was a member of the United Methodist Church. Edwards died on September 10, 2026, at the age of 88.
