= Physical Education Building (Arkansas Tech University) =

- Physical Education Building--Arkansas Tech University
- U.S. National Register of Historic Places
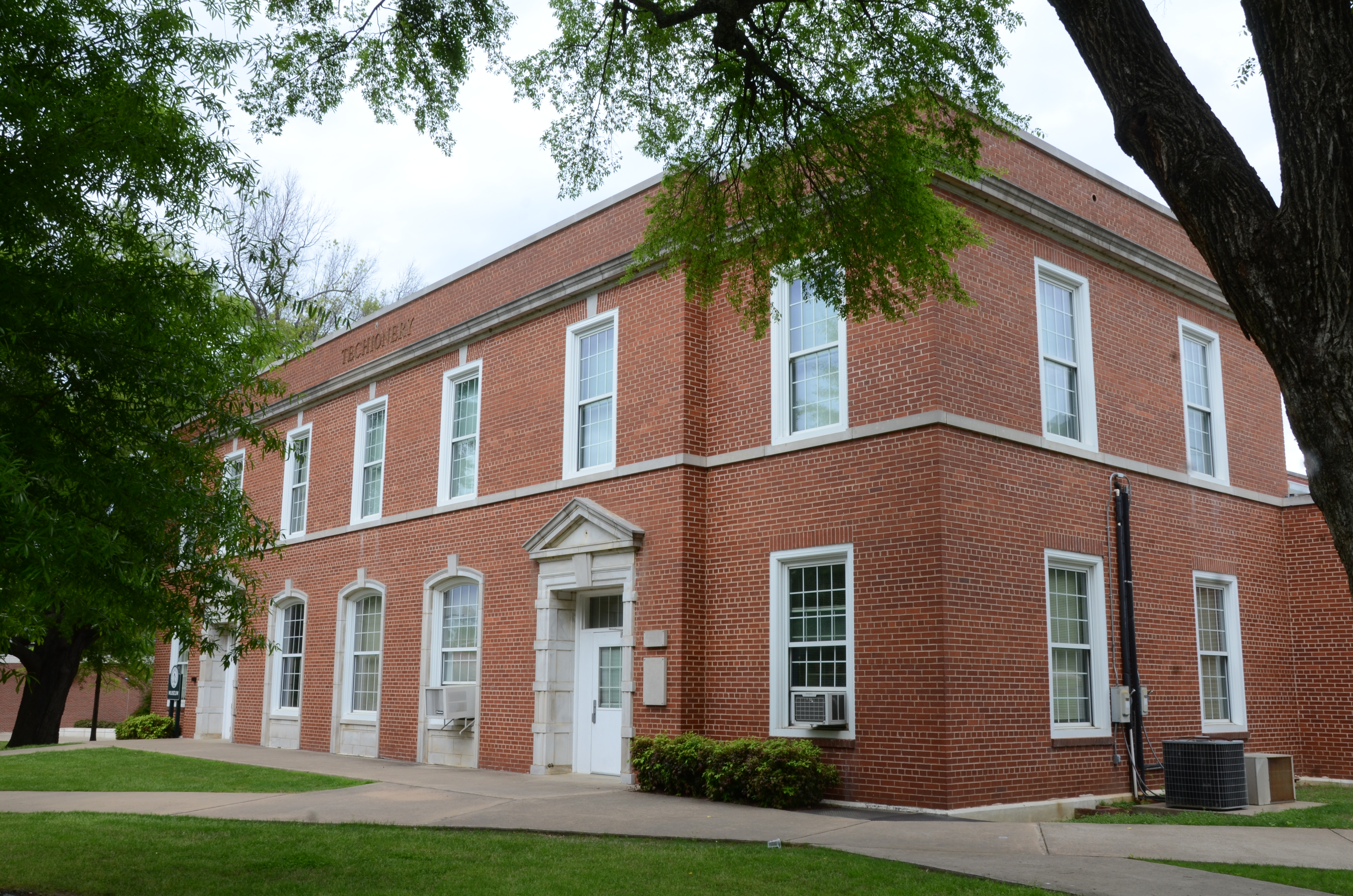

- Location within Arkansas Location within the United States
- Location: Jct. of N. El Paso and W. O Sts., SE corner, Arkansas Tech University campus, Russellville, Arkansas
- Coordinates: 35°17′36″N 93°8′11″W
- Area: less than one acre
- Built: 1937
- Built by: Federal Emergency Administration of Public Works; Et al.
- Architectural style: Classical Revival
- MPS: Public Schools in the Ozarks MPS
- NRHP reference No.: 92001211
- Added to NRHP: September 10, 1992

The former Physical Education Building of the Arkansas Tech University is a historic academic building at 1502 North El Paso Avenue in Russellville, Arkansas. It is a two-story brick Classical Revival structure, built in 1937 with funding from the Federal Emergency Administration of Public Works. Now known as the Techionery Building, the building currently houses the Arkansas Tech Museum with displays about the history of the university.

The building was listed on the National Register of Historic Places in 1992.

== See also ==
- National Register of Historic Places listings in Pope County, Arkansas
