= James Word =

American politician

James Louis Word

Member of the Arkansas House of Representatives from the 16th district
- In office January 2009 – January 2015
- Preceded by: Earnest Brown
- Succeeded by: Ken Ferguson

Personal details
- Party: Democratic
- Education: University of Arkansas at Pine Bluff; University of Wisconsin–Milwaukee

James Louis Word (born c. 1953) is an American politician and a Democratic former member of the Arkansas House of Representatives for District 16 from 2009 to 2015. He was term-limited and ineligible to seek a fourth legislative term in 2014.

== Education ==
Word earned his bachelor's degree from the University of Arkansas at Pine Bluff and his MPA from University of Wisconsin–Milwaukee.

== Elections ==
- 2012 Word was unopposed for both the May 22, 2012 Democratic Primary and the November 6, 2012 General election.
- 2000 When the District 73 seat was open, Word ran in the three-way 2000 Democratic primary but lost to Booker Clemons, who was unopposed for the November 7, 2000 General election.
- 2008 Redistricted to District 16, when Earnest Brown left the Legislature and left the seat open, Word placed first in the three-way May 20, 2008 Democratic Primary with 1,253 votes (38.9%), won the June 10 runoff election with 1,269 votes (67.1%), and was unopposed for the November 4, 2008 General election.
- 2010 Word was unopposed for both the May 18, 2010 Democratic primary and the November 2, 2010 general election.
