= Mark Lowery =

American politician (1957–2023)

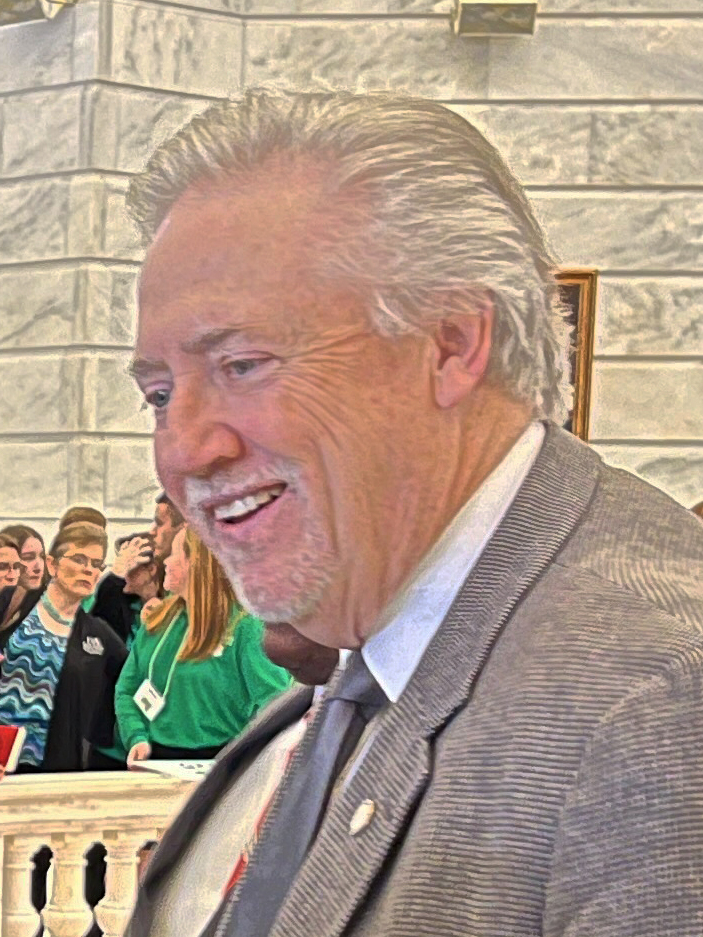
- Lowery in 2023

39th Treasurer of Arkansas
- In office January 10, 2023 – July 26, 2023
- Governor: Sarah Huckabee Sanders
- Preceded by: Dennis Milligan
- Succeeded by: Larry Walther

Member of the Arkansas House of Representatives from the 39th district
- In office January 14, 2013 – January 9, 2023
- Preceded by: Tracy Steele
- Succeeded by: Wayne Long

Personal details
- Born: Mark Dale Lowery; March 28, 1957 Little Rock, Arkansas, U.S.
- Died: July 26, 2023 (aged 66) Little Rock, Arkansas, U.S.
- Party: Republican
- Children: 2
- Education: University of Arkansas (BA, MA)

Mark Dale Lowery (March 28, 1957 – July 26, 2023) was an American politician. He served as treasurer of Arkansas from January to July 2023. He previously served as a Republican member for the 39th district of the Arkansas House of Representatives.

== Biography ==
Lowery graduated from Sylvan Hills High School. He earned a bachelor's degree and a master's degree from the University of Arkansas. From April 1994 to July 1995, Lowery was chief of staff to Mike Huckabee, then the lieutenant governor of Arkansas.

In 2013, Lowery was elected for the 39th district of the Arkansas House of Representatives. He assumed office on January 14, 2013, and served for ten years. In the 2022 elections, Lowery announced that he would run for Secretary of State of Arkansas, but changed his candidacy to run for Treasurer of Arkansas in 2022 election. Lowery defeated Mathew Pitsch in the Republican Party primary election and won the general election against Pam Whitaker, the Democratic Party nominee.

Lowery's health had deteriorated through his year as treasurer. He had two strokes, one in March and a more severe one in June, and subsequently announced he would retire in September. However, he died at a hospital in Little Rock on July 26, 2023, at age 66.

Party political offices
| Preceded by Dennis Milligan | Republican nominee for Treasurer of Arkansas; 2022 | Succeeded by John Thurston |
Political offices
| Preceded by Dennis Milligan | Treasurer of Arkansas; 2023 | Succeeded by Larry Walther |
