= Grant Hodges =

American politician

Member of the Arkansas House of Representatives from the 14th district
- In office January 1, 2023 – January 13, 2025
- Preceded by: Roger Lynch
- Succeeded by: Nick Burkes

Member of the Arkansas House of Representatives from the 96th district
- In office January 1, 2015 – July 10, 2020
- Preceded by: Duncan Baird
- Succeeded by: Jill Bryant

Personal details
- Born: Ozark, Missouri, U.S.
- Party: Republican
- Education: University of Arkansas

Grant Hodges is an American politician, serving as a member of the Arkansas House of Representatives from the 14th district. He assumed office in January 2023. He left office on January 13, 2025, and was succeeded by Nick Burkes. He previously served as a Republican member for the 96th district of the Arkansas House of Representatives.

Born in Ozark, Missouri. Hodges attended the University of Arkansas, where he earned a bachelor's degree and master's degree in political science. In 2015, he was elected to represent the 96th district of the Arkansas House of Representatives, succeeding Duncan Baird. In 2020, Hodges decided not to run for office again, and he took a position at Northwest Arkansas Community College as its executive director of community and government relations and marketing. He was succeeded as state representative for the 96th district by Jill Bryant.
