= 2026 Arkansas State Auditor election =

- November 3, 2026
Nominee	Dennis Milligan
Party	Republican
Incumbent State Auditor
Dennis Milligan
Republican

The 2026 Arkansas State Auditor election took place on November 3, 2026, to elect the Arkansas State Auditor. Incumbent Republican State Auditor Dennis Milligan won re-election to a second term in office. Milligan ran unopposed.

== Republican primary ==
=== Candidates ===
==== Nominee ====
- Dennis Milligan, incumbent state auditor

== See also ==
- 2026 United States state auditor elections
- 2026 Arkansas elections
