= Williamson Hall (Arkansas Tech University) =

- Williamson Hall-Arkansas Tech University
- U.S. National Register of Historic Places
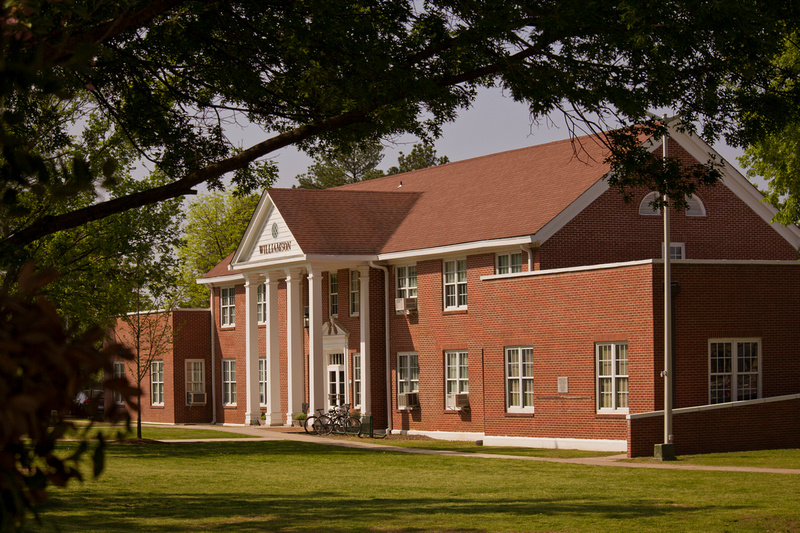

- Location within Arkansas Location within the United States
- Location: N. El Paso St., Arkansas Tech University campus, Russellville, Arkansas
- Coordinates: 35°17′25″N 93°8′13″W
- Area: 2 acres (0.81 ha)
- Built: 1940
- Built by: National Youth Administration
- Architectural style: Colonial Revival
- MPS: Public Schools in the Ozarks MPS
- NRHP reference No.: 92001208
- Added to NRHP: September 18, 1992

Williamson Hall is a historic academic building on the campus of Arkansas Tech University in Russellville, Arkansas. It is located just north of West L Street and west of North El Paso Street. It is a two-story brick building with Colonial Revival features, built in 1940 with funding support from the National Youth Administration. It is distinguished by its Greek temple pavilion on the front facade, supported by six Doric columns. The building was named for Marvin Williamson, who was the first Director of Bands at Arkansas Tech; as well as the first student to enroll at the school. It houses classrooms and faculty offices.

The building was listed on the National Register of Historic Places in 1992.

On April 3, 2019, Williamson Hall sustained a fire on the second floor, destroying and damaging a significant portion of the building. After a historic preservation project to restore Williamson Hall and return it to service as an academic building, faculty and staff returned in December 2021 with classes conducted again in the spring 2022 semester.

== See also ==
- National Register of Historic Places listings in Pope County, Arkansas
