= Hughes Hall (Arkansas Tech University) =

- Hughes Hall-Arkansas Tech University
- U.S. National Register of Historic Places
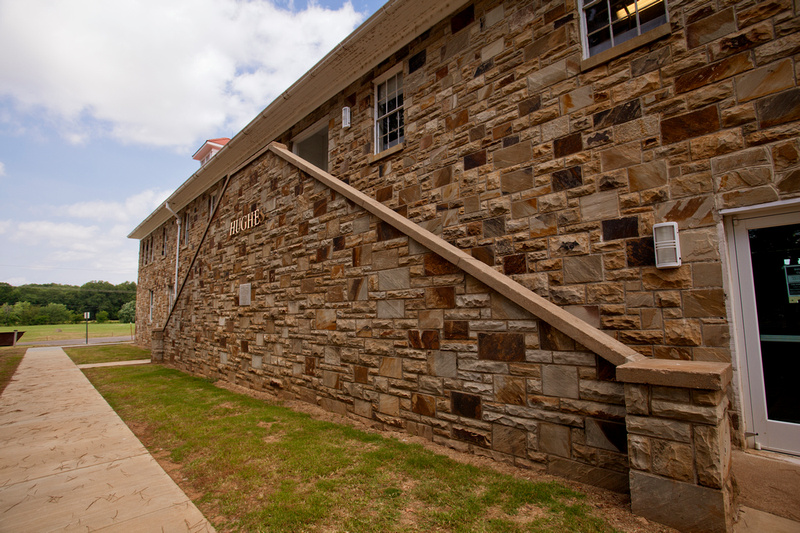

- Location within Arkansas Location within the United States
- Location: W. M St., Arkansas Tech University campus, Russellville, Arkansas
- Coordinates: 35°17′32″N 93°8′20″W
- Area: less than one acre
- Built by: Works Progress Administration
- Architectural style: Late 19th And Early 20th Century American Movements, Plain Traditional
- MPS: Public Schools in the Ozarks MPS
- NRHP reference No.: 92001210
- Added to NRHP: September 18, 1992

Hughes Hall is a historic dormitory at the corner of West M and North Glenwood Streets, on the campus of Arkansas Tech University in Russellville, Arkansas. It is a two-story stone building in a U-shaped plan, with a hip roof and stone foundation. The roof of its front facade is pierced by two small hip-roofed dormers. It was built as a classroom building in 1940, with funding support from the Works Progress Administration. In 2009, it was converted into a dormitory.

The building was listed on the National Register of Historic Places in 1992.

== See also ==
- National Register of Historic Places listings in Pope County, Arkansas
