= Tommy Wren =

American politician

Member of the Arkansas House of Representatives from the 71st district
- In office 2011–2013
- Succeeded by: Andrea Lea

Arkansas State Representative for District 62
- In office 2013–2015
- Succeeded by: Michelle Gray

Personal details
- Born: August 4, 1976 (age 50)
- Party: Democratic
- Spouse: Ann
- Education: University of Central Arkansas
- Occupation: Farmer

Thomas Quentin Wren Jr., known as Tommy Wren (born August 4, 1976), is a former member of the Arkansas House of Representatives. He served from 2011 to 2015 in the Democratic Party, representing the 62nd district in his first term and the 71st district in his second term. He was unseated by Republican Michelle Gray of Melbourne in 2014.

Wren was hired as a conservation program manager by the Arkansas Natural Resources Commission in 2015. Wren's son Grant played college baseball at the University of Arkansas.
