= Charles Robinson (Arkansas politician) =

American politician from Arkansas (born 1946)

Charles W. Robinson

37th Treasurer of Arkansas
- In office May 29, 2013 – January 13, 2015
- Governor: Mike Beebe
- Preceded by: Martha Shoffner
- Succeeded by: Dennis Milligan

Personal details
- Born: Harrison, Arkansas, U.S.
- Party: Democratic
- Education: Arkansas Tech University (B.S.); University of Arkansas (MBA)
- Profession: Accountant, Government Auditor

Charles W. Robinson (born 1946) is an Arkansas Democratic politician and former government auditor who served as the State Treasurer of Arkansas from May 29, 2013, to January 13, 2015. He was appointed to the office by Governor Mike Beebe following the resignation of Martha Shoffner, who vacated the position after her arrest on federal corruption charges. Robinson came out of retirement to serve in the role and was constitutionally ineligible to seek election to a full term in 2014.

Prior to his appointment as State Treasurer, Robinson had a distinguished career spanning 34 years in the Division of Legislative Audit, including 28 years as the Legislative Auditor for the state of Arkansas—a role he held from 1979 until his retirement in 2007. He is widely recognised for his reputation for fiscal integrity and nonpartisan professional conduct.

== Early life and education ==
Charles W. Robinson was born in 1946 in Harrison, in Boone County, Arkansas. He pursued higher education in accounting, earning a Bachelor of Science degree in accounting from Arkansas Tech University in Russellville. He subsequently obtained a Master of Business Administration (MBA) from the University of Arkansas at Fayetteville.

Robinson became a member of the American Institute of Certified Public Accountants (AICPA) and the Association of Certified Fraud Examiners (ACFE), reflecting his professional expertise in financial auditing and fraud examination.

== Career in government auditing ==
=== Division of Legislative Audit (1973–2007) ===
Robinson began his public service career as a state employee in the Division of Legislative Audit (DLA), the primary auditing arm of the Arkansas General Assembly. He worked with the Division for a total of 34 years.

According to records maintained by the Encyclopedia of Arkansas, Robinson served as the Legislative Auditor—the top administrative and directing position within the Division—from 1979 to 2007, making him the second person to hold the role since the Division's establishment in 1953. His tenure as Legislative Auditor, spanning 28 years, is the longest in the Division's history. He was succeeded in the post by Roger A. Norman, who served from 2007 to 2024.

As the Legislative Auditor, Robinson oversaw the Division's work issuing annual financial audits, reviews, and special reports to the Arkansas General Assembly and the Legislative Joint Auditing Committee (LJAC). The Division, operating within the legislative branch of Arkansas government, is tasked with promoting sound financial management and accountability of public resources.

Robinson retired from the Division of Legislative Audit on July 31, 2007.

== State Treasurer of Arkansas (2013–2015) ==
=== Background: Shoffner resignation ===
On May 21, 2013, State Treasurer Martha Shoffner—a Democrat—resigned from office following her arrest by federal authorities on charges of political corruption. Federal prosecutors alleged that Shoffner had accepted at least $36,000 in cash payments from a bond broker who conducted business with the State Treasurer's Office, in exchange for directing a disproportionate share of the state's bond investments to his firm. Shoffner was subsequently tried and convicted on 14 counts of bribery and extortion.

=== Appointment ===
On May 29, 2013, Governor Mike Beebe, a Democrat, announced the appointment of Charles Robinson as State Treasurer of Arkansas to serve out the remainder of Shoffner's term. Robinson, who described himself as a political independent and noted that he had not contributed to any political candidate since his retirement, came out of retirement to accept the governor's call.

At the announcement press conference, Governor Beebe praised Robinson, stating he was "everything I can ask for as a manager," noting that Robinson knew "how to lead people and listen to people." Robinson was sworn in on May 29, 2013, in the Arkansas Supreme Court chamber.

Under Arkansas state law, Robinson was ineligible to stand for election to the office in the 2014 elections, as appointees filling a vacancy are barred from seeking the office.

=== Role and ex officio responsibilities ===
As State Treasurer, Robinson assumed responsibility for managing Arkansas's state funds, overseeing deposits, investments, and disbursements. Per Arkansas law, the State Treasurer also serves in a number of ex officio capacities, including as:

- Secretary of the Arkansas State Board of Finance
- Ex officio member of the Arkansas Public Employees Retirement System Board of Trustees
- Ex officio member of the Arkansas Teacher Retirement System Board of Trustees
- Ex officio member of the Arkansas Development Finance Authority Board of Trustees
- Member of the Arkansas State Highway Employees Retirement System Board of Trustees
- Member of the Arkansas Rural Endowment Fund Board of Trustees

These responsibilities were significant given the treasurer's role in overseeing bond investments, the very issue at the centre of his predecessor's legal troubles.

=== Salary decision ===
Following his appointment, Robinson announced his intention to return his state salary to the state government, citing an unwillingness to collect two public payments simultaneously—his state treasurer's salary alongside his existing retirement pension from the Division of Legislative Audit. He described the decision in terms of public accountability: "I don't want anyone to ever think that I am trying to double dip."

Although Robinson had initially sought to decline his salary entirely, state law and personnel regulations did not permit an outright refusal. Instead, after paying applicable taxes, Robinson returned the remainder of his annual salary—reported at approximately $54,000—to the state in a personal check at the close of the fiscal year. At the time, Robinson's state retirement pension amounted to approximately $5,400 per month, or more than $64,000 annually.

=== Tenure and performance ===
During his tenure, Robinson focused on stabilising the office following the Shoffner scandal and implementing reforms mandated by a new state law overhauling the Treasurer's Office. Robinson's primary goal, as articulated by Governor Beebe and members of the Arkansas legislature, was to restore public confidence in the office.

One year into his appointment, in May 2014, both the governor and members of the state legislature publicly praised Robinson for his conduct in the role. An Associated Press report carried by UALR Public Radio noted that Robinson had "fulfilled the goal laid out for him by the governor and lawmakers: Keep the low-profile office out of the news."

=== Successor and end of term ===
In the November 4, 2014 general election, Republican Dennis Milligan won the Arkansas State Treasurer's race against Democrat Karen Garcia and Libertarian Chris Hayes. Milligan was sworn in as State Treasurer on January 13, 2015, succeeding Robinson.

== Political views ==
Robinson publicly described himself as a political independent. He stated at the time of his appointment in 2013 that he had not made a political contribution to any candidate since his retirement from the Division of Legislative Audit in 2007. He was registered as a Democrat, but consistently characterised his approach to government as apolitical. At his swearing-in press conference, Robinson stated: "I think I'm apolitical, and I'm too old to change."

== Personal life ==
Robinson is a native of Harrison, Arkansas, in Boone County. At the time of his appointment, he resided in North Little Rock, Arkansas. He was 66 years of age when appointed to the State Treasurer position in May 2013.

== See also ==
- Treasurer of Arkansas
- Martha Shoffner
- Dennis Milligan
- Mike Beebe
- Arkansas Legislative Audit
- Arkansas elections, 2014

== Sources ==
- Moritz, Rob (May 30, 2013). "New Arkansas Treasurer Sworn In". Times Record. Stephens Media / Arkansas News Bureau. Archived from the original on March 3, 2016.
- "Mike Beebe Names Charles Robinson State Treasurer". Arkansas Business. May 29, 2013.
- Brantley, Max (May 29, 2013). "Beebe names Charles Robinson, former state audit director, state treasurer". Arkansas Times.
- "Good luck to you, sir". Arkansas Democrat-Gazette. June 3, 2013.
- "New Arkansas Treasurer is Charles Robinson". Fox 16 (KLRT). May 30, 2013.
- "Charles Robinson Praised As Fills Out Term Of Arkansas Treasurer". UALR Public Radio. Associated Press. May 30, 2014.
- "Arkansas Legislative Audit — Encyclopedia of Arkansas". Encyclopedia of Arkansas.
- "State Treasurer, Office of — Encyclopedia of Arkansas". Encyclopedia of Arkansas.
- "Charles Robinson (Arkansas)". Ballotpedia.
- "About Arkansas Legislative Audit". Arkansas Legislative Audit. 2021.

Government offices
Preceded by Martha Shoffner	Treasurer of Arkansas; 2013–2015	Succeeded by Dennis Milligan
