= Joe Cloud =

American politician

Member of the Arkansas House of Representatives from the 71st district
- In office January 14, 2019 – January 9, 2023
- Preceded by: Kenneth Henderson
- Succeeded by: Brandon Achor

Personal details
- Party: Republican
- Education: University of Arkansas at Little Rock; University of Arkansas Medical School

Joe Cloud is an American politician. He served as a Republican member for the 71st district of the Arkansas House of Representatives.

Cloud attended the University of Arkansas at Little Rock, where he earned his Bachelor of Science degree, then earned a medical degree at the University of Arkansas for Medical Sciences. Cloud practised as a physician. In 2019, he was elected for the 71st district of the Arkansas House of Representatives. He assumed office on January 14, 2019. In August 2021, Cloud announced that he would not seek re-election.

On December 29, 2021, new legislative districts went into effect. Most of the District 71 area that Cloud represented is now District 44. The current District 71 is north and west of Little Rock.
