= Nick Burkes =

American politician

Member of the Arkansas House of Representatives from the 14th district
- Incumbent
- Assumed office January 13, 2025
- Preceded by: Grant Hodges

Personal details
- Born: Fayetteville, Arkansas, U.S.
- Party: Republican
- Education: Baylor University (BA); Rice University (MAcc)

Nick Burkes is an American accountant and politician. He serves as a Republican member for the 14th district of the Arkansas House of Representatives.

== Life and career ==
Burkes was born in Fayetteville, Arkansas. He attended Baylor University, earning his bachelor's degree. He also attended Rice University, earning his master's degree in accounting.

In March 2024, Burkes defeated Joshua Hagan in the Republican primary election for the 14th district of the Arkansas House of Representatives. In November 2024, he defeated Jacob Malloy in the general election, winning 65 percent of the votes. He succeeded Grant Hodges. He assumed office on January 13, 2025.
