= Sharon Trusty =

American politician

Member of the Arkansas Senate from the 4th district
- In office January 8, 2001 – September 1, 2009
- Preceded by: Wayne Dowd
- Succeeded by: Michael Lamoureux

Personal details
- Born: August 27, 1945 (age 80) Oregonia, Ohio
- Party: Republican
- Children: 3

Sharon Trusty (born August 27, 1945) is an American politician who served in the Arkansas Senate from the 4th district from 2001 to 2009. She wrote a book.

== Early life ==
On August 27, 1945, Trusty was born in Oregonia, Ohio.

== Education ==
Trusty attended Arkansas Tech University.

== Career ==
Trusty is a businesswoman.

In 1984, Trusty became the co-chair of Arkansas Republican can Party. In 2000, Trusty became a senator of Arkansas State Senate, which she served until 2009.

== Personal life ==
Trusty is married with 3 children.
