= Caraway Hall (Arkansas Tech University) =

- Caraway Hall-Arkansas Tech University
- U.S. National Register of Historic Places
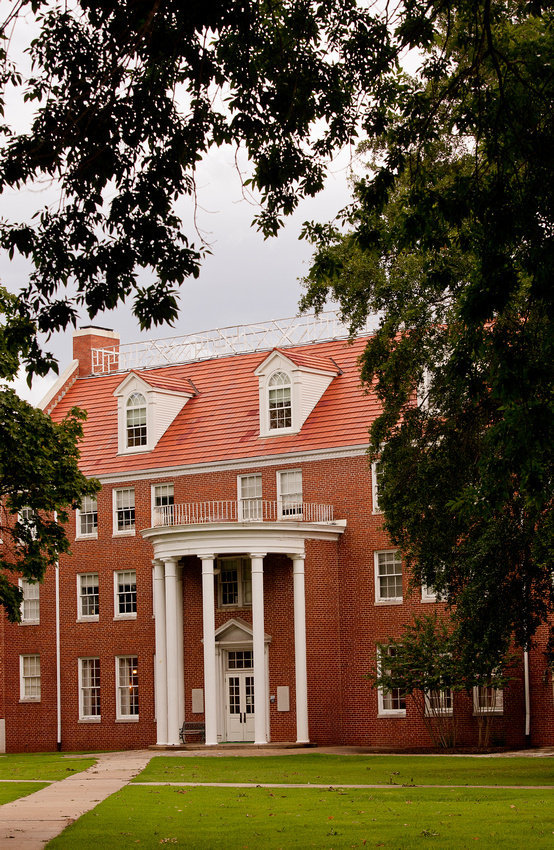

- Location within Arkansas Location within the United States
- Location: N. Arkansas St., campus of Arkansas Tech University, Russellville, Arkansas
- Coordinates: 35°17′33″N 93°8′2″W
- Area: 1.4 acres (0.57 ha)
- Built: 1934
- Built by: Federal Emergency Administration
- Architectural style: Colonial Revival
- MPS: Public Schools in the Ozarks MPS
- NRHP reference No.: 92001213
- Added to NRHP: September 10, 1992

Caraway Hall is a historic dormitory building on the campus of Arkansas Tech University in Russellville, Arkansas, U.S. It is a brick building with Colonial Revival styling, built in 1934 with funding from the Federal Emergency Administration of Public Works, later known as the Public Works Administration. It is roughly H-shaped, with a central three-story section with a gabled roof and end chimneys, which is flanked by two-story flat-roofed wings, one longer than the other.

The building was listed on the National Register of Historic Places in 1992.

== See also ==
- National Register of Historic Places listings in Pope County, Arkansas
