= Earnest Brown Jr. =

American politician & judge (born 1970)

Earnest E. Brown, Jr. (born April 27, 1970) is an American lawyer and professor who has served as a prosecutor, judge and state legislator.

Born in Hope, Arkansas, Brown received his bachelor's degree from University of Arkansas in 1991 and his J.D. degree from University of Arkansas School of Law in 1994. He then served as assistant prosecuting attorney for Jefferson-Lincoln County Prosecuting Attorney office and was adjunct professor of criminal justice at the University of Arkansas at Pine Bluff. He served in the Arkansas House of Representatives in 2007 as a Democrat. He served as Assistant Speaker and represented Jefferson County, Arkansas. In 2008, Brown was elected Arkansas Circuit Court judge and took office in 2009.
