= Dennis Milligan =

American politician

36th Arkansas State Auditor
- Incumbent
- Assumed office January 10, 2023
- Governor: Sarah Huckabee Sanders
- Preceded by: Andrea Lea

38th Treasurer of Arkansas
- In office January 13, 2015 – January 10, 2023
- Governor: Asa Hutchinson
- Preceded by: Charles Robinson
- Succeeded by: Mark Lowery

Circuit Clerk of Saline County
- In office January 2011 – January 13, 2015
- Preceded by: Doug Kidd
- Succeeded by: Myka Bono Sample

Chair of the Arkansas Republican Party
- In office May 19, 2007 – December 13, 2008
- Preceded by: Gilbert Baker
- Succeeded by: Doyle Webb

Personal details
- Born: Dennis Lee Milligan; October 24, 1957 (age 68) Conway, Arkansas, U.S.
- Party: Republican
- Spouse: Tina Milligan
- Education: University of Arkansas, Little Rock (attended)

Dennis Lee Milligan (born October 24, 1957) is the current Arkansas State Auditor following the 2022 election. He previously served as Treasurer of Arkansas. For that position he won the Republican Party nomination in the primary election on May 20, 2014, and the general election on November 4, 2014. Milligan took office as treasurer on January 13, 2015.

Milligan was born in Conway in Faulkner County, Arkansas. Prior to his election as state treasurer, he was the circuit clerk of Saline County, based in Benton, for two terms from 2011, and an Arkansas businessman for thirty years. Milligan is a former chairman of the Arkansas Republican Party from 2007 to 2008 and has served as its treasurer.

Milligan ran against Duncan Baird in the 2014 primary, and his opponents in the general election that year included Democrat Karen Garcia and Libertarian Chris Hayes. Libertarian Ashley Ewald ran against Milligan in the 2018 general election, in which he was re-elected with 71 percent of the vote.

== Electoral history ==
2018 Election for Treasurer of Arkansas
Party	Candidate	Votes	%	±%
Republican	Dennis Milligan	611,189	71	
Libertarian	Ashley Ewald	250,943	29	

2014 Election for Treasurer of Arkansas
Party	Candidate	Votes	%	±%
Republican	Dennis Milligan	464,620	56	
Democratic	Karen Garcia	307,263	37	
Libertarian	Chris Hayes	52,440	6	

2014 Republican Primary Election for Treasurer of Arkansas
Party	Candidate	Votes	%	±
Republican	Dennis Milligan	86,994	53	
Republican	Duncan Baird	75,673	47	

2010 Election for Circuit Clerk of Saline County, Arkansas
Party	Candidate	Votes	%	±%
Republican	Dennis Milligan	17,967	52.5	
Democratic	Doug Kidd (incumbent)	16,258	47.5	

Party political offices
Preceded by Gilbert Baker	Chair of the Arkansas Republican Party; 2007–2008	Succeeded by Doyle Webb
Vacant Title last held by Chris Morris	Republican nominee for Treasurer of Arkansas; 2014, 2018	Succeeded by Mark Lowery
Preceded by Andrea Lea	Republican nominee for Auditor of Arkansas; 2022, 2026	Most recent
Political offices
Preceded by Charles Robinson	Treasurer of Arkansas; 2015–2023	Succeeded by Mark Lowery
Preceded by Andrea Lea	Auditor of Arkansas; 2023–present	Incumbent
