= Arkansas Tech University =

Public university in Russellville, Arkansas, U.S.

Coordinates: 35°17′40″N 93°08′02″W

- Former names: Second District Agricultural School (1909–1925); Arkansas Polytechnic College (1925–1976)
- Type: Public university
- Established: 1909; 117 years ago
- President: Russell Jones
- Students: 9,487 (fall 2023)
- Undergraduates: 8,808
- Postgraduates: 679
- Location: Russellville, Arkansas, United States
- Campus: City, 516 acres (2.09 km^{2})
- Colors: Green and gold
- Nicknames: Wonder Boys (men); Golden Suns (women)
- Sporting affiliations: NCAA Division II – GAC
- Mascots: Wonder Boys & Golden Suns
- Website: www.atu.edu

Arkansas Tech University (ATU) is a public university in Russellville, Arkansas, United States. The university offers programs at both baccalaureate and graduate levels in a range of fields. The Arkansas Tech University–Ozark Campus, a two-year satellite campus in the town of Ozark, primarily focuses on associate and certificate education.

== History ==
=== Early history (1909–76) ===
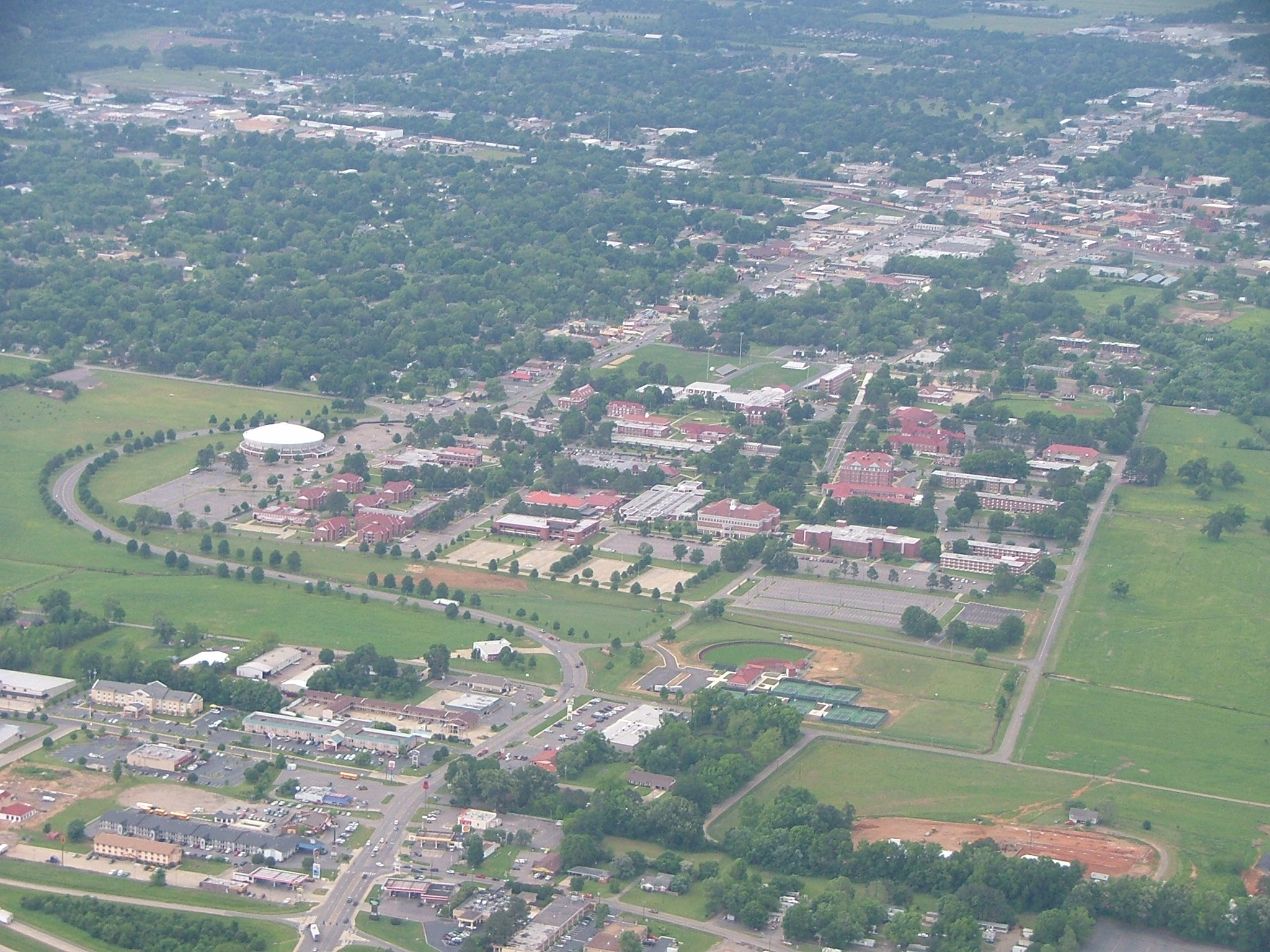
Aerial view of Arkansas Tech University, 2008

In 1909, Act 100, passed by the Arkansas General Assembly and signed by Governor George Donaghey, provided for the creation of one agricultural high school in each of four districts stipulated in the act, with what would eventually become Arkansas Tech University in the Second District.

The schools were to teach horticulture and textile making in addition to agriculture. The location for each of the four schools was to be chosen by that district's five trustees, appointed by the Governor, taking into consideration "the nature of the soil, healthfulness of location, general desirability, and other material inducements offered, such as the donation of buildings, land or money." The four schools eventually evolved into four present-day institutions of higher learning. The First District Agricultural School at Jonesboro evolved into Arkansas State University; the Second District Agricultural School in Russellville is today's Arkansas Tech University; the Third District Agricultural School in Magnolia became Southern Arkansas University; and the University of Arkansas Monticello began as the Fourth District Agricultural School.

After evaluating proposals from Fort Smith, Morrilton, Ozark, and Russellville, on February 10, 1910, Second District Agricultural School trustees announced that the school would be located in Russellville. Construction of the school's Main Building began on April 10, 1910, with contracts for additional buildings let in June 1910. On October 26, 1910, the first classes were held in Russellville. The original purpose of the school was to offer a secondary (or high school) education in agricultural and technical subjects. Later, the school took on the first two years of college instruction, and the school's name was changed to Arkansas Polytechnic College by the General Assembly in 1925 to reflect this change in purpose. The school became a two-year junior college in 1927 and, at the end of the 1929–1930 academic year, stopped offering high school classes.

=== Recent history (1976–present) ===
The school took on its current name of Arkansas Tech University on July 9, 1976.

In the fall of 2003, Arkansas Tech University announced it intended to take over the state vocational school, Arkansas Valley Technical Institute, in Ozark, the seat of Franklin County. As of July 1, 2004, the Ozark campus has acted as a satellite campus of Arkansas Tech and has begun offering coursework leading toward an Associate of Applied Science degree in various subjects.

From 1997 to 2015, enrollment at Arkansas Tech increased by 183 percent. The fall of 2015 marked the 17th consecutive year that Arkansas Tech established a new institutional record for largest enrollment, then 12,054 students, making ATU the third largest institution of higher learning in the state.

Term	Total students
Fall 2009	8,814
Fall 2010	9,815
Fall 2011	10,464
Fall 2012	10,950
Fall 2013	11,369
Fall 2014	12,002
Fall 2015	12,054
Fall 2016	11,894
Fall 2017	11,830
Fall 2018	12,101
Fall 2019	11,829
Fall 2020	10,829
Fall 2021	9,640
Fall 2022	9,445
Fall 2023	9,487

Arkansas Tech has invested $180 million in upgrades to its infrastructure since 1995 and the university has added more than 40 new academic programs of study under the leadership of Robert C. Brown, who has served as president of Arkansas Tech since 1993. In April 2014, Robin E. Bowen was selected by the university trustees to succeed Brown. When she took office on July 1, 2014, she became the first woman to lead a four-year, public Arkansas university. Russell Jones was named interim president at Arkansas Tech by the ATU Board of Trustees on August 17, 2023. The board elected him president on June 20, 2024, and he officially took office on July 1, 2024.

== Facilities on National Register of Historic Places ==
Several Tech buildings are listed on the National Register of Historic Places.

- Caraway Hall — residence hall, renovated in 2024
- Old Art Building — retired academic building, now known as Browning Hall, renovated in 2013 to house administrative offices
- Hughes Hall — residence hall, renovated in 2010
- Techionery — academic building, mainly used as a theatre shop and performance space by the ATU Theatre Department
- Williamson Hall — academic building, renovated in 2003 to include kitchen facilities
- Wilson Hall — residence hall

== Academics ==
ATU underwent academic restructuring in 2022 placing programs into four colleges:

- College of Arts & Humanities
- College of Business and Economic Development
- College of Education & Health
- College of STEM

The university also has several academic centers:

- Academic Advising Center
- Center for Teaching and Learning
- Museum
- Ross Pendergraft Library and Technology Center
- Student Support Services

== Athletics ==
Undergraduate demographics as of Fall 2023
Race and ethnicity	Total
White	72%
Hispanic	12%
Black	6%
Two or more races	5%
Asian	2%
International student	2%
American Indian/Alaska Native	1%
Economic diversity
Low-income (Note: The percentage of students who received an income-based federal Pell grant intended for low-income students.)	48%
Affluent (Note: The percentage of students who are a part of the American middle class at the bare minimum.)	52%

Athletics logo used until 2023

Athletics logo (c. 1982)

Arkansas Tech participates in NCAA Division II athletics as a charter member of the Great American Conference. Tech was a member of the Gulf South Conference from 1995 to 2011. Previously, Tech was a member of the Arkansas Intercollegiate Conference in the National Association of Intercollegiate Athletics. The university fields four men's and six women's varsity sports, as well as a club sports program:

Men's sports

- Baseball
- Basketball
- Football
- Golf

Women's sports

- Basketball
- Cross country
- Golf
- Softball
- Tennis
- Volleyball

Club / recreation sports

- Cycling
- Fishing
- Paddlers
- Soccer

=== Facilities ===
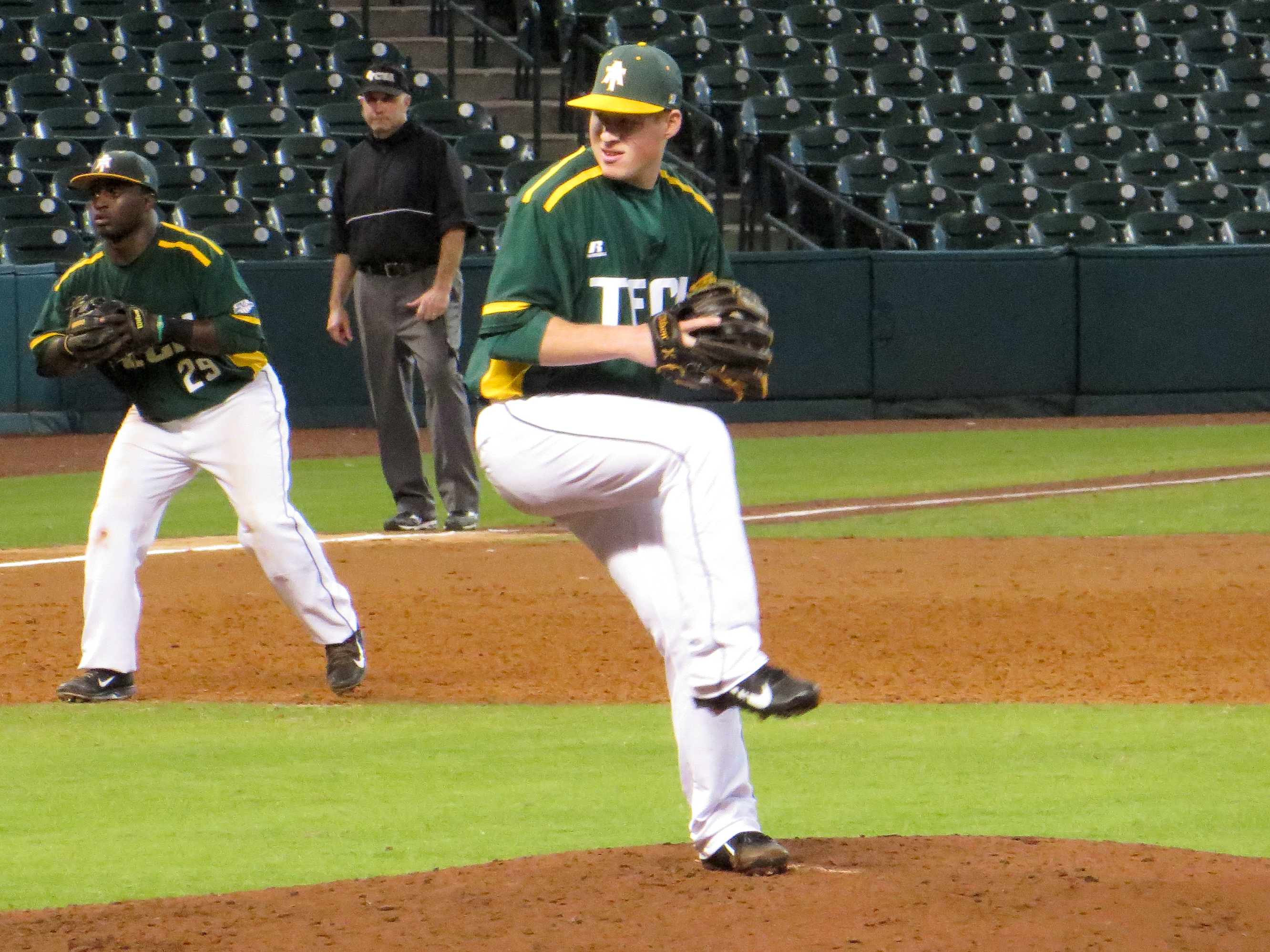
Baseball pitcher Bryson Morris in 2014

Arkansas Tech University has dual nicknames: men's athletic teams are called the Wonder Boys, while the women's teams are called the Golden Suns.

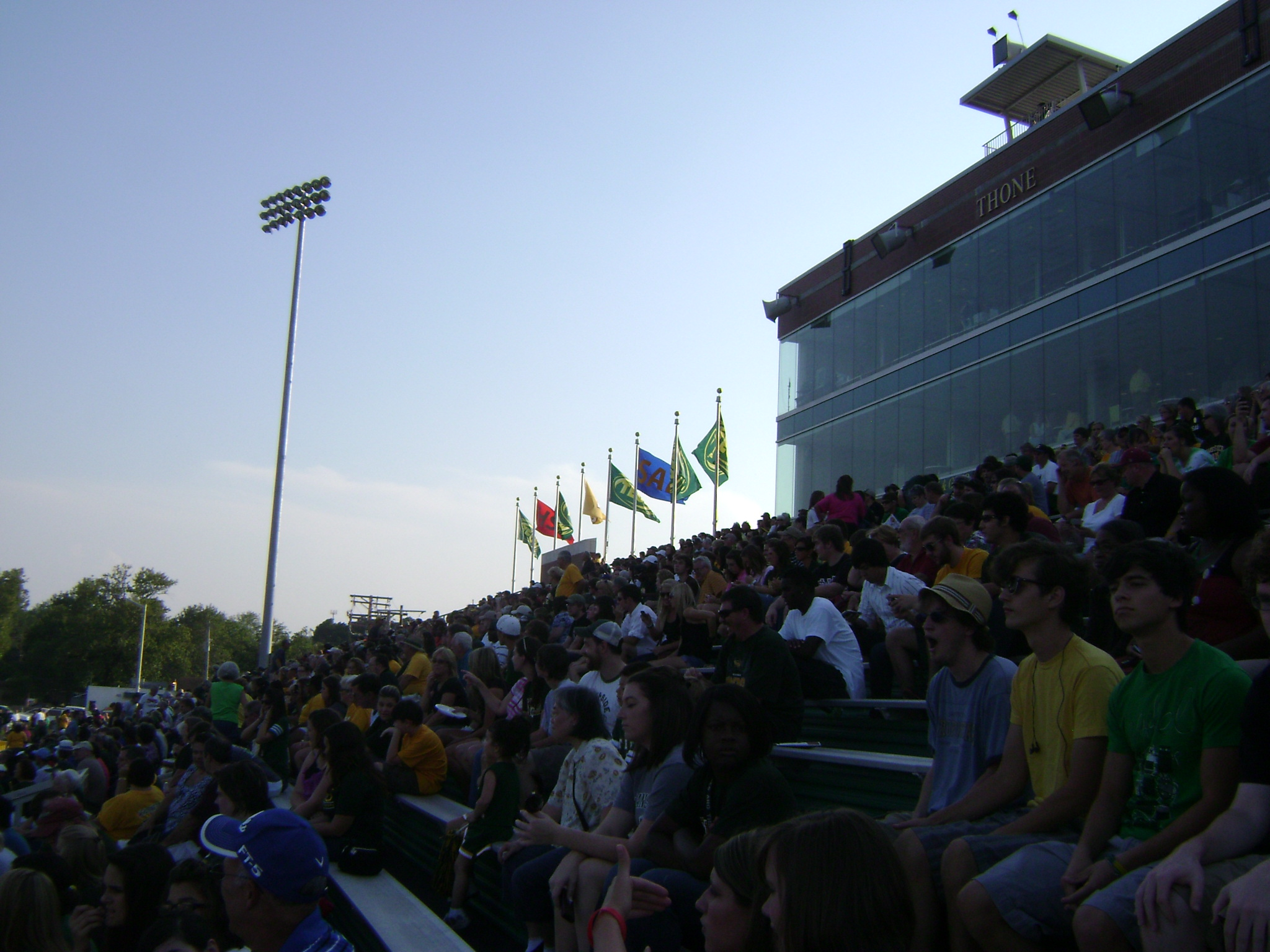
Thone Stadium at Buerkle Field

- Chartwells Women's Sports Complex (tennis, softball)
- Hull Building (Athletic Training, Athletic Performance Development, intramurals)
- Baswell Field (baseball, capacity 600)
- Thone Stadium at Simmons Bank Field (football, capacity 6,500)
- Tucker Coliseum (basketball/volleyball, capacity 3,500)

=== Nicknames ===
On November 15, 1919, John Tucker, a 17-year-old freshman from Russellville, scored two touchdowns and kicked two extra points to lead the Second District Agricultural School Aggies to a 14–0 upset win over Jonesboro. In newspaper accounts following the game, Tucker and his teammates were referred to as "Wonder Boys," and the nickname remains to this day. Tucker was labeled as "The Original Wonder Boy" and was associated with the school for the rest of his life. He went on to play on the University of Alabama's Rose Bowl team in 1931 and served Arkansas Tech in a variety of roles – including coach, athletic director and chemistry professor – between 1925 and 1972. Two buildings on the Tech campus – Tucker Coliseum and Tucker Hall – are named in his honor.

Tired of being referred to as the Wonder Girls or Wonderettes, the female athletes of Arkansas Tech held a contest in the spring of 1975 to determine what their new mascot would be. Several names were nominated, but in the end, the athletes selected Golden Suns as their new nickname.

== Notable alumni ==
- Denny Altes (Bachelor of Business Administration), clergyman and Republican former member of the Arkansas House of Representatives from District 63; former member of the Arkansas State Senate and former Senate Minority Leader
- Stan Berry, politician
- Leon L. "Doc" Bryan (Class of 1942), U.S. Navy veteran, Arkansas Hall of Distinction member, Democratic member of the Arkansas House of Representatives (1965–1995), Speaker of the Arkansas House of Representatives (1993–1995), honored with the naming the Doc Bryan Student Services Center by the ATU Board of Trustees in 1998
- John Burris, member of the Arkansas House of Representatives from Boone County
- Robert E. Dale (bachelor's degree in mathematics), Republican member of the Arkansas House of Representatives from District 68 in Pope and Van Buren counties; former member of the Dover School Board in Dover
- Eliah Drinkwitz (B.A. social studies education, 2004), Head Football Coach, University of Missouri.
- Trevor Drown (Class of 2001), Republican member of the Arkansas House of Representatives for Pope and Van Buren counties since 2015; Libertarian Party U.S. Senate nominee in 2010
- Jane English (Class of 1981, economics/finance), Republican member of the Arkansas State Senate from District 34 in Pulaski County
- Jon Eubanks (B.S. in accounting, 1990), Republican member of the Arkansas House of Representatives from Logan County
- Elizabeth Gracen (attended), former Miss America in 1982; won the contest when she was a junior accounting major at Arkansas Tech
- Kevin Hern (B.S. 1986), Republican U.S. representative for Oklahoma's 1st Congressional District, 2018–present
- Michael Lamoureux, Republican; former Arkansas State Representative from District 68 (Pope County) 2005–2009; former Arkansas State Senator from District 4, 2009–2013; former Arkansas State Senator from District 16 (Newton and Pope counties and parts of Boone, Carroll and Van Buren counties) 2013–2014; chief of staff to the governor of Arkansas 2015–present
- Andrea Lea (B.S. in emergency administration and management), Republican member of the Arkansas House of Representatives from Russellville since 2009; candidate for state auditor in 2014
- Kelley Linck (B.S. in business administration, 1986), Republican member of the Arkansas House of Representatives from Marion County since 2011
- Tanner Marsh, Montreal Alouettes quarterback of the Canadian Football League.
- Eddie Meador, Los Angeles Rams safety (1959-70); six-time Pro Bowl and two-time All-Pro selection who intercepted a Rams franchise record 46 passes.
- Rebecca Petty (B.S. in criminal justice, 2013), Republican member of the Arkansas House of Representatives for Benton County since 2015; advocate of child crime victims, resident of Rogers, Arkansas
- Scott Richardson (bachelor's degree in computer and information sciences, master's degree in information technology), member of the Arkansas House of Representatives
- Marcus Richmond (B.S. in physical education), Republican member of the Arkansas House of Representatives from multi-county District 21 in western Arkansas
- Tray Scott (Class of 2008), defensive line coach at the University of Georgia
- Greg Standridge (B.S. in business, 1987), Republican member of the Arkansas State Senate for Pope, Newton, Boone, Carroll and Van Buren counties since 2015; insurance agent in Russellville
- Boyd Anderson Tackett, Democratic U.S. representative from Arkansas's 4th congressional district, 1949–1953
- Steve Womack (B.A., 1979), Republican U.S. representative from Arkansas's 3rd congressional district, 2010–present
