= Dover, Arkansas =

- City
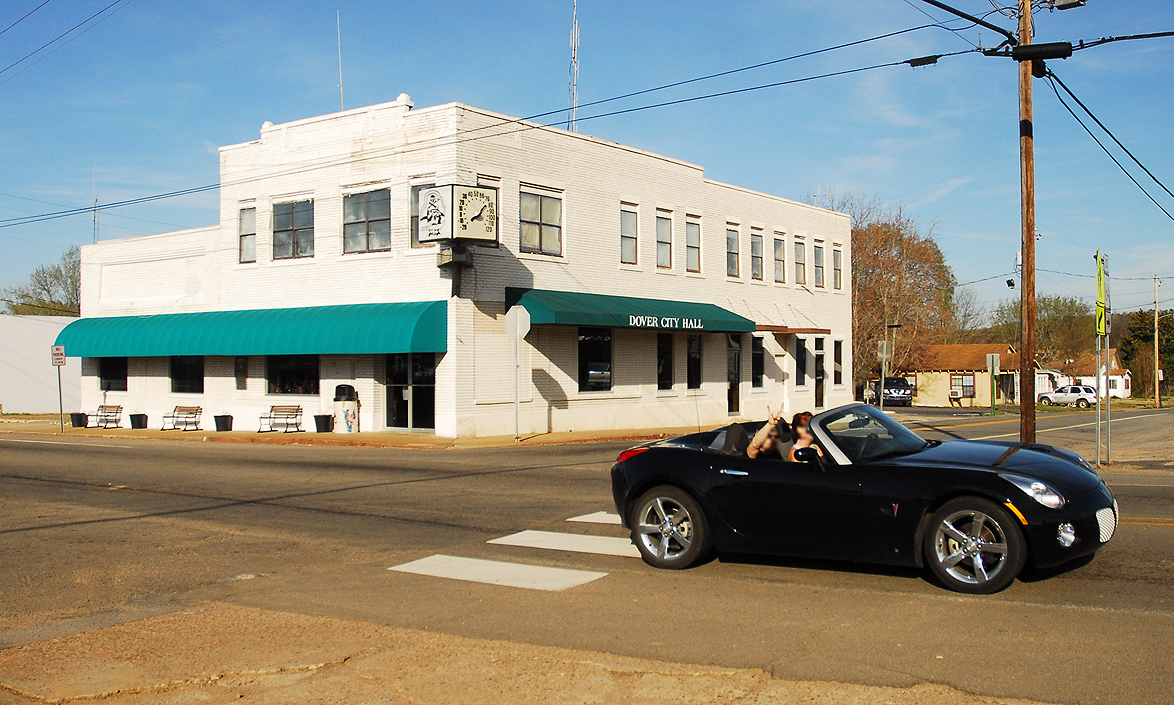
- Main Street

- Location of Dover in Pope County, Arkansas.
- Coordinates: 35°23′28″N 93°06′51″W
- Country: United States
- State: Arkansas
- County: Pope
- Named for: Dover, England or Dover, Tennessee

Government
  - Type: Mayor-council
  - Mayor: Roger Lee

Area
  - Total: 2.83 sq mi (7.32 km^{2})
  - Land: 2.83 sq mi (7.32 km^{2})
  - Water: 0 sq mi (0.00 km^{2})
- Elevation: 410 ft (120 m)

Population (2020)
  - Total: 1,337
  - Estimate (2025): 1,385 ▲
  - Density: 472.9/sq mi (182.58/km^{2})
- Time zone: UTC-6 (Central (CST))
  - Summer (DST): UTC-5 (CDT)
- ZIP code: 72837
- Area code: 479
- FIPS code: 05-19600
- GNIS feature ID: 2403504
- Website: www.doverar.com

Dover is a town in Pope County, Arkansas, United States. The population was 1,337 at the 2020 census. Dover is located in the Arkansas River Valley, and is part of the Russellville Micropolitan Statistical Area.

== History ==
Dover was either named by British aristocrats in the 1830s for Dover, England or by Stephen Rye in 1832 for Dover, Tennessee. Incorporated December 31, 1852, Dover was the county seat for Pope County from 1841 to 1887 with the county's brick courthouse on the square bounded by present-day Camp, Market, Water, and Elizabeth Streets.

During the American Civil War, what little civil authority there was collapsed throughout Arkansas. By 1863, in most of the state, travel was dangerous, farming hazardous, and county government inoperative. Pope County records at Dover were moved to a cave for protection. Several skirmishes took place in the county, but there were no major engagements. On April 8, 1865, Dover, including the courthouse, was burned.

During the military reconstruction period (1867-1868), companies E and G of the Nineteenth Infantry were stationed in Pope County and headquartered at Dover for a year and a half. Arkansas became the second former Confederate state to be fully restored to the Union in June 1868. However, political and social stability was still years away.

Between 1865 and 1870, at least four county officials were assassinated: Sheriff Archibald D. Napier and Deputy Sheriff Albert Parks on October 24, 1865, County Clerk William Stout on December 4, 1865, and Sheriff W. Morris Williams on August 20, 1866.

On March 1, 1870, the new Pope County jail in Dover was burned. A man named Glover later claimed responsibility.

As the county seat, Dover played a significant role during period of a little over seven months in 1872 and 1873 that came to be known as the Pope County Militia War, with several significant incidents occurring in or near the town. However, there were no battles or skirmishes. There were no engagements between organized opponents of any kind. Instead, an irregular armed group sometimes referred to as a militia, and headed by four county officers, exerted excessive and harsh control over the county, including threats to burn the county seat. By the end of the period, three of the four officials were dead.

Winds from a storm on March 8, 1878, damaged the county courthouse in Dover, rendering it "unfit and unsafe". With the county having no funds to repair the structure, its condition became a consideration for some in the issue of moving the county seat, with citizens of Russellville offering a building site and $2,500 to build a new courthouse there at no cost to the taxpayers. A church was used for a courtroom during terms of the circuit court while the courthouse was unavailable.

With the new railroad running eight miles south of the county seat at Dover and the gradual relocation of county commerce toward Russellville and Atkins, moving the county seat was inevitable. Russellville was developing into the business center of the county and a newer town, Atkins, was growing fast and would compete as a potential new location for the county seat.

It took 15 years from an act from the Arkansas General Assembly moving the county seat to Russellville—reversed the next year, sending it back to Dover—until the new courthouse was completed in Russellville. Dover had been selected in the 1840s for its more central location in the county. Thirty years later, the southern townships held the majority of the population and paid a large majority of the taxes.

After a judge ordered a March 19, 1887, special election, the county seat was moved from Dover to Russellville after the Arkansas Supreme Court affirmed the judge's ruling on June 4, 1887.

More than half of the businesses in the commercial part of town were lost to fire on February 15, 1930, as were at least 8 homes on two city blocks. At least 11 businesses were lost or badly damaged. A fire truck from neighboring Russellville helped in fighting the fire, but with no municipal fire water system, the truck had to draw water from a large well at a Dover business. Fighting the blaze, thought to have originated as a grass fire, was hampered by the lack of a water supply and high winds. The buildings lost were of wood frame construction.

=== The Simmons massacre ===
On December 22 and 26, 1987, Ronald Gene Simmons, of near Dover, killed all fourteen members of his family during a Christmas reunion at the Simmons property 5 miles north of Dover. Two days later, he continued his killing spree in the county seat of Russellville, having targeted previous employers and co-workers, killing two and wounding two more. Simmons was arrested without resistance, was sentenced to death on December 10, 1989, waived mandatory appellate review, and executed on June 25, 1990, the quickest sentence-to-execution time in the United States since the death penalty was reinstated in 1976.

== Geography ==
According to the United States Census Bureau, the city has a land area of 2.8 square miles (7.3 km^{2}).

Ecologically, Dover is located within the Arkansas Valley Hills subregion within the larger Arkansas Valley ecoregion. The subregion is a thin transition area between the flat and fertile Arkansas Valley Plains to the south along the Arkansas River, and the steep and densely forested lands of the Boston Mountains in northern Pope County.

The mild hills historically supported oak-hickory forest or oak-hickory-pine forest. Elevation changes and soil types make the Arkansas Valley Hills largely unsuitable for row agriculture. Instead, forest has been cleared for pastureland, poultry farming or ranching. Logging remains an important land use where elevation or soil makes livestock farming unsuitable. Many of the smaller streams and watercourses are completely dry in summer.

== Demographics ==
Historical population
Census	Pop.	Note	%±
1880	368		—
1890	528		43.5%
1900	373		−29.4%
1910	385		3.2%
1920	388		0.8%
1930	510		31.4%
1940	493		−3.3%
1950	510		3.4%
1960	525		2.9%
1970	662		26.1%
1980	948		43.2%
1990	1,055		11.3%
2000	1,329		26.0%
2010	1,378		3.7%
2020	1,337		−3.0%
2025 (est.)	1,385	▲	3.6%
U.S. Decennial Census

=== 2020 census ===
As of the 2020 census, Dover had a population of 1,337. The median age was 38.3 years. 22.9% of residents were under the age of 18 and 18.2% of residents were 65 years of age or older. For every 100 females there were 91.3 males, and for every 100 females age 18 and over there were 92.0 males age 18 and over.

0.0% of residents lived in urban areas, while 100.0% lived in rural areas.

There were 596 households in Dover, of which 28.9% had children under the age of 18 living in them. Of all households, 39.1% were married-couple households, 22.8% were households with a male householder and no spouse or partner present, and 32.4% were households with a female householder and no spouse or partner present. About 34.0% of all households were made up of individuals and 15.9% had someone living alone who was 65 years of age or older.

There were 676 housing units, of which 11.8% were vacant. The homeowner vacancy rate was 0.9% and the rental vacancy rate was 9.4%.

Racial composition as of the 2020 census
Race	Number	Percent
White	1,193	89.2%
Black or African American	6	0.4%
American Indian and Alaska Native	10	0.7%
Asian	3	0.2%
Native Hawaiian and Other Pacific Islander	0	0.0%
Some other race	24	1.8%
Two or more races	101	7.6%
Hispanic or Latino (of any race)	57	4.3%

=== 2000 census ===
As of the 2000 census, there were 1,329 people, 529 households, and 372 families residing in the city. The population density was 732.7 inhabitants per square mile (282.9/km^{2}). There were 579 housing units at an average density of 319.2 per square mile (123.2/km^{2}). The racial makeup of the city was 97.37% White, 0.23% Black or African American, 0.68% Native American, 0.15% Asian, 0.60% from other races, and 0.98% from two or more races. 1.96% of the population were Hispanic or Latino of any race.

There were 529 households, out of which 37.4% had children under the age of 18 living with them, 48.6% were married couples living together, 16.6% had a female householder with no husband present, and 29.5% were non-families. 26.8% of all households were made up of individuals, and 14.2% had someone living alone who was 65 years of age or older. The average household size was 2.50 and the average family size was 3.01.

In the city, the population was spread out, with 29.3% under the age of 18, 10.2% from 18 to 24, 28.1% from 25 to 44, 18.6% from 45 to 64, and 13.8% who were 65 years of age or older. The median age was 32 years. For every 100 females, there were 79.8 males. For every 100 females age 18 and over, there were 79.0 males.

The median income for a household in the city was $27,697, and the median income for a family was $33,879. Males had a median income of $25,625 versus $19,073 for females. The per capita income for the city was $13,261. About 10.6% of families and 14.6% of the population were below the poverty line, including 13.9% of those under age 18 and 14.0% of those age 65 or over.

== Government ==
Dover operates within the mayor-city council form of government. The mayor is elected by a citywide election to serve as the Chief Executive Officer (CEO) of the city by presiding over all city functions, policies, rules and laws. Once elected, the mayor also allocates duties to city employees. The Dover mayoral election in coincidence with the United States midterm elections. Mayors serve four-year terms and can serve unlimited terms. The city council is the unicameral legislature of the city, consisting of six council members. Also included in the council's duties is balancing the city's budget and passing ordinances.

== Education ==
Primary and secondary education is provided by the Dover School District, which leads to graduation from Dover High School.

== Notable people ==
- Jeff Davis, 20th Governor of Arkansas (1901-1907), later a US Senator (1907-1913)
- Trevor Drown, Republican member of the Arkansas House of Representatives for Pope and Van Buren counties since 2015; succeeded Robert Dale
- Kevin Hern, Republican member of the U.S. House of Representatives representing Oklahoma's 1st district since 2018
- Nik and Sam, country music duo
- Ronald Gene Simmons, retired United States Air Force master sergeant who killed sixteen people over a weeklong period in 1987, beginning in Dover
