= Andrea Lea =

American politician and auditor

Auditor of Arkansas
- In office January 13, 2015 – January 10, 2023
- Governor: Asa Hutchinson
- Preceded by: Charlie Daniels
- Succeeded by: Dennis Milligan

Member of the Arkansas House of Representatives from the 71st district
- In office January 2013 – January 13, 2015
- Preceded by: Tommy Wren
- Succeeded by: Kenneth Henderson

Member of the Arkansas House of Representatives from the 68th district
- In office January 2009 – January 2013
- Preceded by: Michael Lamoureux
- Succeeded by: Robert Dale

Personal details
- Born: 1957 (age 67–68)
- Political party: Republican
- Spouse: Phillip Lea
- Children: 3
- Education: Arkansas Tech University, Russellville (BA)

Andrea Christine Lea (born 1957) is an American politician who served as the Arkansas State Auditor and is a Republican former member of the Arkansas House of Representatives from Russellville, Arkansas. She was elected state auditor on November 4, 2014, to succeed the Democratic incumbent, Charlie Daniels, who did not seek reelection.

== Background ==
She attended Russellville High School.

She graduated with a bachelor of science degree in emergency administration and management from Arkansas Tech University at age 47.

== Career ==
=== Early political life and state legislature ===
She began serving in the Arkansas House of Representatives in 2008, representing the areas of Russellville and Pottsville. The district is 68.

Lea was unopposed for a second House term in 2010. In 2012, Lea was switched to House District 71 and again ran without opposition. The previous representative, Democrat Tommy Wren, was transferred to District 62.

Lea was a member of the American Legislative Exchange Council (ALEC). The purpose of this council is to promote sample legislation written by corporations. She was the organization's co-state chairperson along with Eddie Joe Williams, also succeeding Michael Lamoureux in that role.

=== State Auditor ===
In July 2013, she began a campaign for state auditor as a Republican, stating she would look for "efficiencies." She was elected the new auditor of Arkansas in April 2014, defeating Regina Stewart Hampton and Brian Leach. She was the first Republican to serve as state auditor, replacing Democrat Charlie Daniels.

The office of State Auditor is one of Arkansas' seven constitutional offices. The State Auditor is the general accountant for the state and is also in charge of the payroll for the executive, legislative, and judicial branches. The office is also in charge of the state's unclaimed property program. The office has existed since Arkansas was made a United States territory in 1819. Its duties have changed very little since its inception. Lea is the third woman elected to the office of State Auditor. The first woman elected was Jimmie Lou Fisher. The second woman elected was Julia Hughes Jones. Lea is the first Republican woman elected as State Auditor in Arkansas.

In 2016, after she denied using private emails for her job as auditor, texts revealed by the press showed her use of a private gmail address for official state business.

She sought re-election in 2018. Winning the election, she served as auditor until 2023.

==== The Great Arkansas Treasure Hunt ====
The State Auditor's office in Arkansas is in charge of an unclaimed property program. This program is referred to as The Great Arkansas Treasure Hunt. The purpose of this program is to return lost money to their rightful owners. Cash assets and safety deposit box contents are turned over to the State Auditor's office after the institutions holding the property deem it abandoned. According to Lea, in Arkansas, there is $317,000,000 in the unclaimed property as of 2017. She stated that "Reuniting Arkansans with their money is something I take very seriously...We now estimate that 1 in 4 Arkansans has cash to claim in the Treasure Hunt. If you've searched in the past, it's time to search again!"

=== Election as President of NAUPA ===
In January 2019, Lea was elected as the President of the National Association of Unclaimed Property Administrators (NAUPA). This organization is associated with the Association of State Auditors. Its purpose is to create awareness of the importance of unclaimed property as a necessary consumer protection program. Its members represent all fifty states, the District of Columbia, and all of the United States' territories. After Lea was elected as President of this organization, she stated, "I'm honored to be chosen by my colleagues to represent our organization and work to advance our common interest...I look forward to continuing to share our successes in Arkansas across the country and advocating for increased innovation and streamlining of services. It's a win for businesses, and a win for consumers."

== Electoral history ==
Arkansas State House of Representatives 68th District Election, 2008
Party	Candidate	Votes	%
Republican	Andrea Lea	5,681	53.05
Democratic	Thomas Akin	4,634	43.27
Green	Mary Boley	394	3.68

Arkansas State House of Representatives 68th District Election, 2010
Party	Candidate	Votes	%
Republican	Andrea Lea (inc.)	n/a	100.00

Arkansas State House of Representatives 68th District Election, 2012
Party	Candidate	Votes	%
Republican	Andrea Lea (inc.)	n/a	100.00

Arkansas Auditor Republican Primary Election, 2014
Party	Candidate	Votes	%
Republican	Andrea Lea	111,998	68.17
Republican	Ken Yang	52,293	31.83

Arkansas Auditor Election, 2014
Party	Candidate	Votes	%
Republican	Andrea Lea	471,211	57.17
Democratic	Regina Stewart Hampton	308,285	37.40
Libertarian	Brian Leach	44,702	5.42

Arkansas Auditor Election, 2018
Party	Candidate	Votes	%
Republican	Andrea Lea	72.35	621,722
Libertarian	David E. Dinwiddie	27.65	237,602

Party political offices
Vacant Title last held by Mary Jane Rebick	Republican nominee for Arkansas State Auditor; 2014, 2018	Succeeded by Dennis Milligan
Arkansas House of Representatives
Preceded by Michael Lamoureux	Member of the Arkansas House of Representatives for the 68th district 2009–2013	Succeeded by Robert Dale
Preceded by Tommy Wren	Member of the Arkansas House of Representatives for the 71st district 2013–2015	Succeeded by Kenneth Henderson
Political offices
Preceded by Charlie Daniels	Auditor of Arkansas; 2015–2023	Succeeded by Dennis Milligan
