= Dover High School (Arkansas) =

- The Dover Pirates' flag is symbolized as the Jolly Roger

Location
- 101 Pirates Loop; Dover, Arkansas 72837; United States; 35°23′49″N 93°06′59″W

Information
- Type: Public secondary
- Established: August 1922; 104 years ago
- School district: Dover School District
- NCES District ID: 0505430
- CEEB code: 040650
- NCES School ID: 050543000257
- Principal: Jo Lynn Taverner
- Teaching staff: 76.36 (on FTE basis)
- Grades: 9–12
- Enrollment: 400 (2023-2024)
- Student to teacher ratio: 5.24
- Campus type: Rural
- Colors: Black and white
- Song: Oh, Dover High we honor
- Fight song: On with Dover
- Athletics conference: 4A Region 4
- Sports: Football, Golf, Cross Country, Basketball, Competitive Cheer, Baseball, Softball, Volleyball, Athletics
- Mascot: Pirate
- Team name: Dover Pirates
- Yearbook: Pirate
- Affiliations: Arkansas Activities Association
- Website: sites.google.com/doverschools.net/doverhighschool/home

Dover High School is a comprehensive public secondary school located in the rural, distant community of Dover, Arkansas, United States. The school educates more than 350 students annually in grades nine through twelve. Dover is one of five public high schools in Pope County and is the sole high school administered by the Dover School District. The first graduating class of six students, all female, completed studies in the spring of 1923.

== Academics ==
The assumed course of study for students is to complete the Smart Core curriculum developed by the Arkansas Department of Education (ADE), which requires students to complete at least 22 units for graduation. Course offerings include regular and Advanced Placement classes and exams with opportunities for college credit via AP exam. The school is accredited by the ADE.

=== Fine Arts ===
Students may participate in various musical and performing arts including: band (e.g., concert band, jazz band, marching band), choir (e.g., a Concert Choir, Madrigals, Ladies Ensemble, and Barbershop Quartet) and theater (e.g., competitive speech, drama, stagecraft). Students may participate in the Art Club. Both the Dover Senior High Band and Choir programs have been the recipient of various statewide awards. Most recently, the Dover Senior High Choirs were recognized as State Champions at the 2013 Arkansas Choral Performance Assessment under the direction of Mrs. Carrie Taylor. The Dover Midnight Brigade (marching band) has been hailed the "Pride of Pope County."

== Athletics ==
The Dover High School mascot is the Pirate with corresponding references to the Jolly Roger flag and the school colors of black and white.

For the 2012–14 seasons, the Dover Pirates participate in the 4A Region 4 Conference. Competition is primarily sanctioned by the Arkansas Activities Association with student-athletes competing in football, volleyball, baseball, basketball (boys/girls), competitive cheer, dance, golf (boys/girls), soccer (boys/girls), softball, tennis (boys/girls), track and field (boys/girls).

== Notable people ==
- Kevin Hern (1980) member of the United States House of Representatives
