= List of Hampton Pirates in the NFL draft =

This is a list of Hampton Pirates football players in the NFL draft.

== Key ==
B	Back	K	Kicker	NT	Nose tackle
C	Center	LB	Linebacker	FB	Fullback
DB	Defensive back	P	Punter	HB	Halfback
DE	Defensive end	QB	Quarterback	WR	Wide receiver
DT	Defensive tackle	RB	Running back	G	Guard
E	End	T	Offensive tackle	TE	Tight end

== Selections ==
Year	Round	Pick	Overall	Player	Team	Position
1963	19	12	264	Lucien Reeberg	Detroit Lions	T
1968	7	23	188	Anthony Andrews	Baltimore Colts	RB
1968	10	24	270	Ed Tomlin	Baltimore Colts	RB
1978	7	23	189	Reggie Doss	Los Angeles Rams	DE
1986	10	8	257	Ike Readon	Kansas City Chiefs	DT
1988	6	5	142	Carl Painter	Detroit Lions	RB
1992	9	7	231	Johnnie Barnes	San Diego Chargers	WR
1993	5	2	114	Terrence Warren	Seattle Seahawks	WR
1995	7	25	233	Corey Swinson	Miami Dolphins	DT
1996	6	1	168	Hugh Hunter	New York Jets	DE
1998	2	27	57	Cordell Taylor	Jacksonville Jaguars	DB
1999	6	30	199	Antico Dalton	Minnesota Vikings	LB
2000	7	16	222	Jason Thomas	San Diego Chargers	G
2002	7	23	234	Gregory Scott	Washington Redskins	DE
2003	6	13	186	Zuriel Smith	Dallas Cowboys	WR
2004	7	52	253	Isaac Hilton	New York Giants	DE
2005	4	13	114	Jerome Mathis	Houston Texans	WR
2007	2	16	48	Justin Durant	Jacksonville Jaguars	LB
2008	3	3	66	Kendall Langford	Miami Dolphins	DE
2011	3	30	94	Kenrick Ellis	New York Jets	DT
