= Reginald Murdock =

American politician

Member of the Arkansas Senate from the 9th district
- Incumbent
- Assumed office January 9, 2023
- Preceded by: redistricted

Member of the Arkansas House of Representatives from the 48th district (Previously 52nd District)
- In office January 2011 – January 9, 2023
- Preceded by: Nancy Blount
- Succeeded by: redistricted

Personal details
- Born: April 29, 1966 (age 60) South Bend, Indiana
- Party: Democratic
- Education: University of Arkansas

Reginald Murdock (born April 29, 1966) is an American politician and a Democratic member of the Arkansas Senate. Murdock previously served in the Arkansas House of Representatives from 2011 to 2023.

== Political career ==
On April 1, 2020, Murdock became the first Arkansas state legislator to test positive for COVID-19.

== Elections ==
- 2012 Redistricted to District 48, and with Republican Representative Davy Carter redistricted to District 43, Murdock was unopposed for both the May 22, 2012 Democratic Primary and the November 6, 2012 General election.
- 2004 When Representative John Eason left the Legislature and left the seat open, Murdock ran in the 2004 Democratic Primary, but lost to Nancy Blount, who was unopposed for the November 2, 2004 General election.
- 2010 When Representative Blount left the Legislature and left the seat open, Murdock won the May 18, 2010 Democratic Primary with 2,819 votes (61.8%), won the June 8 runoff election with 1,812 votes (50.4%), and was unopposed for the November 2, 2010 General election.
