= Forest High School (Florida) =

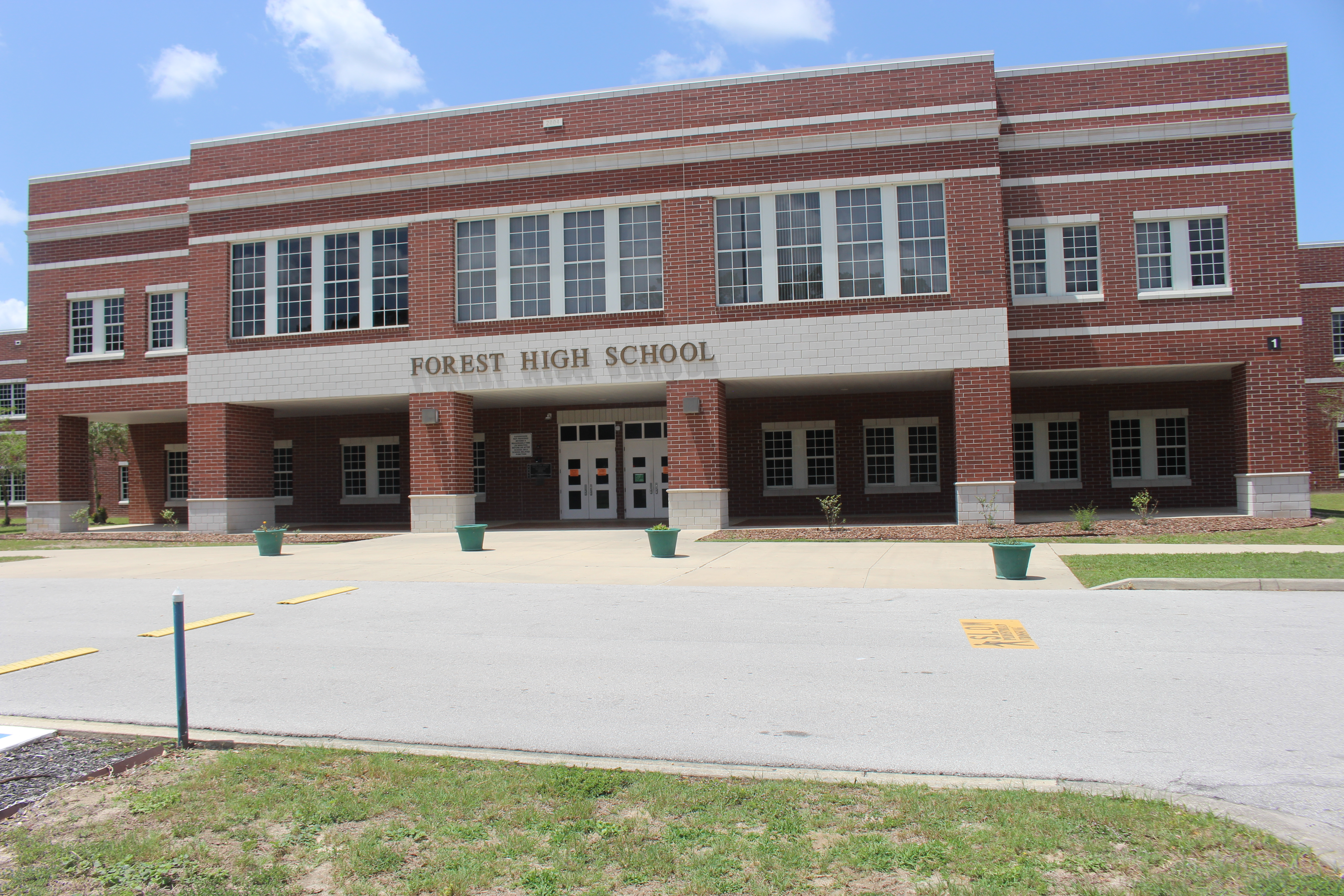

Location
- 5000 Southeast Maricamp Road; Ocala, Marion, Florida 34480; United States; 29°08′39″N 82°03′59″W

Information
- School type: Public secondary
- Established: 15 August 1969
- School district: Marion County Public Schools
- Superintendent: Danielle Brewer
- CEEB code: 101258
- Principal: Dr. Dion Gary
- Teaching staff: 101.00 (FTE)
- Grades: 9–12
- Enrollment: 2,387 (2024–2025)
- Student to teacher ratio: 23.59
- Colors: Green, Gold & White
- Mascot: Wildcat
- Rival: Vanguard High School
- Accreditation: Florida State Department of Education
- Website: fhs.marionschools.net

Forest High School is a high school near Ocala, Florida, United States. It has an EMIT (engineering) program and two magnet programs, College and Career Advanced Placement (CCAP) and the Entrepreneurship Program. The school's colors are green and gold and the school mascot is the Wildcat. It is in the Marion County School District.

The student population as of the 2023-2024 school year is 2,383 students.

== History ==
Forest High School moved to its current location on Maricamp Road, southeast of the city limits of Ocala, in 2005. The school was originally on Fort King Street in Ocala, at the 1959 campus of Ocala High School. Prior to 1965, the school was for white students only. In 1965, a group of 34 students from the nearby black school, Howard High School began attending. In 1969, the courts mandated the schools became fully integrated and Howard was closed. Vanguard High School was opened the same year, and the Marion County School Board put to rest the name Ocala High School.

=== 2018 shooting ===
On April 20, 2018, at 8:29 a.m, 19-year-old Sky Bouche, a former student of the school, went on school premises armed with a sawed-off 16-gauge Winchester Model 12 pump-action shotgun and wearing a black tactical vest. He shot once through a classroom door and a piece of the door hit one student in his ankle, injuring him. Feeling immediate regret, Bouche surrendered to the school staff. He was soon arrested and taken into custody.

Bouche was charged with Terrorism, Aggravated Assault with a Firearm, Culpable Negligence, Carrying a Concealed Firearm, Possession of a Firearm on School Property, Possession of a Short-Barreled Shotgun, Interference in a School Function, and Armed Trespassing on School Property. In 2021, Bouche was sentenced to 30 years imprisonment, with the possibility of parole only after 25 years, followed by an additional 30 years of probationary release. After Bouche was sentenced, he claimed that he heavily regretted the incident and that he "deserved to be put away."

== Programs ==
=== Engineering and Manufacturing Institute of Technology (EMIT) ===
EMIT is a four-year magnet engineering program at Forest High School. EMIT aims to teach its students engineering fundamentals to prepare them for postsecondary colleges or universities in engineering. The curriculum is heavily project-based that often includes problem-solving tasks which must be built and later presented to teachers. These projects typically cover the basics of many engineering disciplines, including civil engineering, aerospace engineering, and more.

EMIT was created from a $1.2 million Florida Department of Education grant in 1994. An application is required to be considered for admission.

== Notable alumni ==
- Alex Shelnutt - drummer of American rock band A Day to Remember
- C. Farris Bryant – Governor of Florida from 1961 to 1965
- Erin Jackson - American Olympic speedskater
- Jonathan Johnson – Major League Baseball pitcher
- Judd Davis – football place-kicker
- Mava Lee Thomas – All-American Girls Professional Baseball League player
- Mike Sullivan – professional golfer on the PGA Tour, Nationwide Tour, and the Champions Tour
- Reid Nichols - Major League Baseball outfielder
- Rick Tuten – punter in the National Football League
- Scot Brantley – linebacker in the National Football League (NFL) for the Tampa Buccaneers of the NFL
- Tony Beckham – football cornerback
- Tyrone Young – wide receiver in the National Football League
