= Mike Tomlin =

American professional football coach (born 1972)

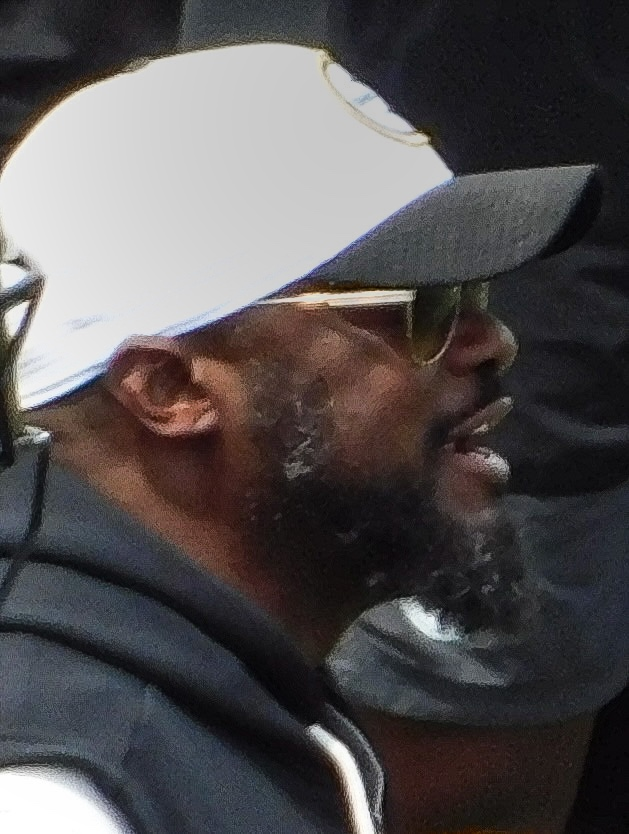
- Tomlin with the Pittsburgh Steelers in 2025

Personal information
- Born: March 15, 1972 (age 54); Hampton, Virginia, U.S.

Career information
- Position: Wide receiver
- High school: Denbigh (Newport News, Virginia)
- College: William & Mary (1990–1994)

Career history
- VMI (1995) Wide receivers coach; Memphis (1996) Graduate assistant; Arkansas State (1997) Wide receivers coach; Arkansas State (1998) Defensive backs coach; Cincinnati (1999–2000) Defensive backs coach; Tampa Bay Buccaneers (2001–2005) Defensive backs coach; Minnesota Vikings (2006) Defensive coordinator; Pittsburgh Steelers (2007–2025) Head coach

Awards and highlights
- As head coach: Super Bowl champion (XLIII); As assistant coach: Super Bowl champion (XXXVII); NFL records: Most consecutive non-losing seasons to begin a coaching career: 19

Head coaching record
- Regular season: 193–114–2 (.628)
- Postseason: 8–12 (.400)
- Career: 201–126–2 (.614)
- Coaching profile at Pro Football Reference

Michael Pettaway Tomlin (born March 15, 1972) is an American former professional football coach who was the head coach for the Pittsburgh Steelers of the National Football League (NFL) from 2007 to 2025. During his 19 seasons as head coach, Tomlin never finished with a losing record, the longest streak in NFL history. He began his NFL career as defensive assistant before joining the Steelers. Tomlin led Pittsburgh to 13 playoff appearances, eight division titles, three AFC Championship Games, two Super Bowl appearances, and a title in Super Bowl XLIII. At age 36, Tomlin was the youngest head coach to win the Super Bowl at the time. He is also tied with Chuck Noll for the most regular season wins in franchise history. Following his resignation, Tomlin became an analyst on NBC's Football Night in America.

== Early life ==
Tomlin was born on March 15, 1972, in Hampton, Virginia, the younger of two sons; his brother, Eddie, is three and a half years older. Tomlin's father, Ed, played football at Hampton Institute in the 1960s, was drafted by the Baltimore Colts, and later played for the Montreal Alouettes in the Canadian Football League. Ed died in January 2012 at age 64 from an apparent heart attack in Ocala, Florida. However, Tomlin hardly knew his birth father and was raised by his mother and stepfather, Julia and Leslie Copeland, who married when Tomlin was six years old.

Tomlin graduated from Denbigh High School in Newport News, Virginia in 1990. He graduated from the College of William and Mary with a sociology degree five years later, becoming a member of Kappa Alpha Psi fraternity. As a wide receiver, Tomlin was a second-team All-Yankee Conference selection in 1994.

== Coaching career ==
=== Collegiate assistant ===
Tomlin's coaching career began in 1995 as the wide receiver coach at Virginia Military Institute under head coach Bill Stewart. Tomlin spent the following season as a graduate assistant at the University of Memphis, where he worked with the defensive backs and special teams. Tomlin was hired by Arkansas State University in 1997 to coach its defensive backs. He stayed there for two seasons before being hired as the defensive backs coach by the University of Cincinnati.

=== Tampa Bay Buccaneers (2001–2005) ===
In 2001, Tomlin was hired as the defensive backs coach for the Tampa Bay Buccaneers under head coach Tony Dungy, where Tomlin first learned the Tampa 2 defense that he would use in later coaching jobs.

Tomlin was retained under new head coach Jon Gruden, and in 2002 and 2005, the Buccaneers led the NFL in total defense (fewest yards allowed per game). During Tomlin's tenure, the defense never ranked worse than sixth overall. When the Buccaneers won Super Bowl XXXVII in January 2003, they recorded a Super Bowl-record five interceptions, three of which were returned for touchdowns.

=== Minnesota Vikings (2006) ===
In 2006, Tomlin was selected by Minnesota Vikings head coach Brad Childress to be his defensive coordinator.

Two of the players on the Vikings roster were older than Tomlin, and Tomlin had been a teammate of Vikings safety Darren Sharper while at William and Mary. The Vikings finished the season with the NFL's eighth-best overall defense, but had the unusual distinction of finishing as the top-ranked defense against the run and the worst-ranked defense against the pass.

=== Pittsburgh Steelers (2007–2025) ===
==== Hiring and Super Bowl XLIII: 2007–2009 ====
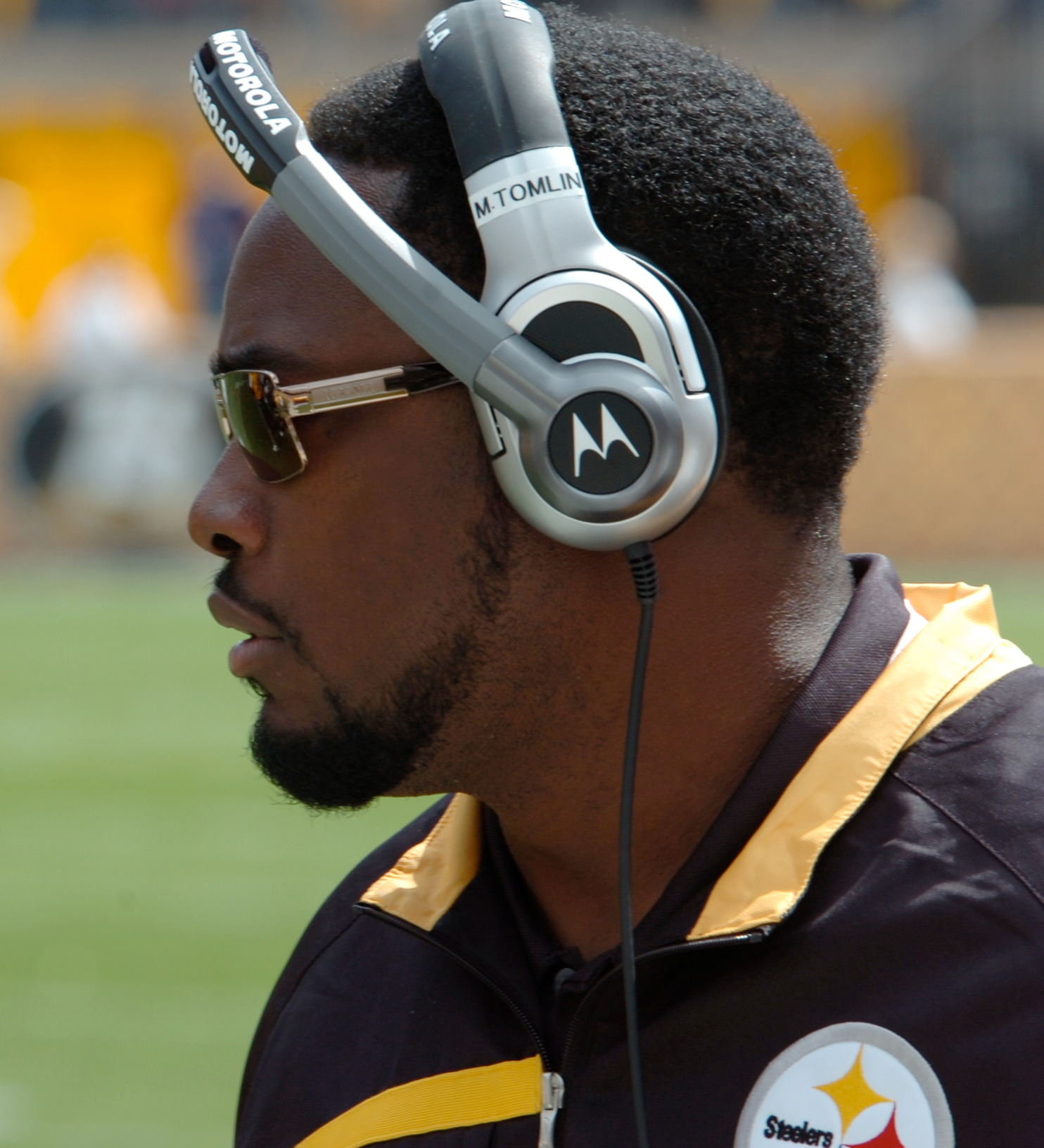
Tomlin in 2007

After spending 2006 as the Vikings' defensive coordinator, Tomlin was selected to interview for the vacant head coaching position with the 2005 Super Bowl champion Pittsburgh Steelers. With only a year of experience as a defensive coordinator, Tomlin was hired on January 27, 2007, to become the 16th head coach in franchise history, replacing Bill Cowher, who retired after spending 15 years with the team. Tomlin had also interviewed for the head coaching vacancy with the Miami Dolphins, a job that eventually went to former Indiana head coach Cam Cameron. With Tomlin, the Steelers continued a trend of hiring head coaches in their 30s. The others were Cowher (age 34 in 1992), Chuck Noll (38 in 1969), Bill Austin (38 in 1966), John Michelosen (32 in 1948), Jim Leonard (35 in 1945), Aldo Donelli (33 in 1941), Walt Kiesling (35 in 1939), Johnny Blood (33 in 1937), and Joe Bach (34 in 1935).

Tomlin is the 10th African-American head coach in NFL history and the first for the Steelers. Then-Steelers owner Dan Rooney had served as the head of the NFL's diversity committee and proposed the Rooney Rule, requiring that teams interview at least one minority candidate when hiring a new head coach. Although Tomlin's ascension to an NFL head coaching job has been cited as evidence of the rule working as intended, Rooney himself disputed this, as he had already interviewed a minority candidate prior to interviewing Tomlin.

The Rooney Rule dictates that for all head-coaching openings, each team must interview at least one minority candidate. But here's what's interesting: The coach who might be the Rooney Rule's greatest advertisement didn't benefit from it. "Let me say this: Mike Tomlin was not part of the Rooney Rule," Rooney said. "We had already interviewed Ron Rivera [then the Bears' defensive coordinator], and so that fulfilled the obligation," Rooney said. "We went on, had heard about Mike, called him in and talked to him. He was very impressive."

Terms of Tomlin's contract were not officially released. The Pittsburgh Post-Gazette reported a four-year deal paying $2.5 million per year, with an option for a fifth year.

In contrast to Bill Cowher, who retained only longtime running backs coach Dick Hoak from Chuck Noll's staff (Hoak himself retired just before Cowher's resignation), Tomlin retained many of Cowher's assistants, most notably defensive coordinator Dick LeBeau, whose defensive philosophy contrasted with Tomlin's. This was done in order to keep team chemistry with the players, since the team was only one year removed from a Super Bowl win at the time of Tomlin's hiring. In 2007, the Steelers finished with the top-ranked defense in the NFL. Tomlin led the Steelers to the AFC North Division championship and a 10–6 record in his first year as head coach. The Steelers narrowly lost in the first round of the playoffs to the Jacksonville Jaguars by a score of 31–29. Tomlin began his career with a 15–7 record in regular season play—as did his predecessor Cowher and all-time win-leader Don Shula. Tomlin set a Steelers record for most wins, after winning 22 games in his first two seasons as head coach while also becoming the first coach in franchise history to win division titles in his first two seasons.

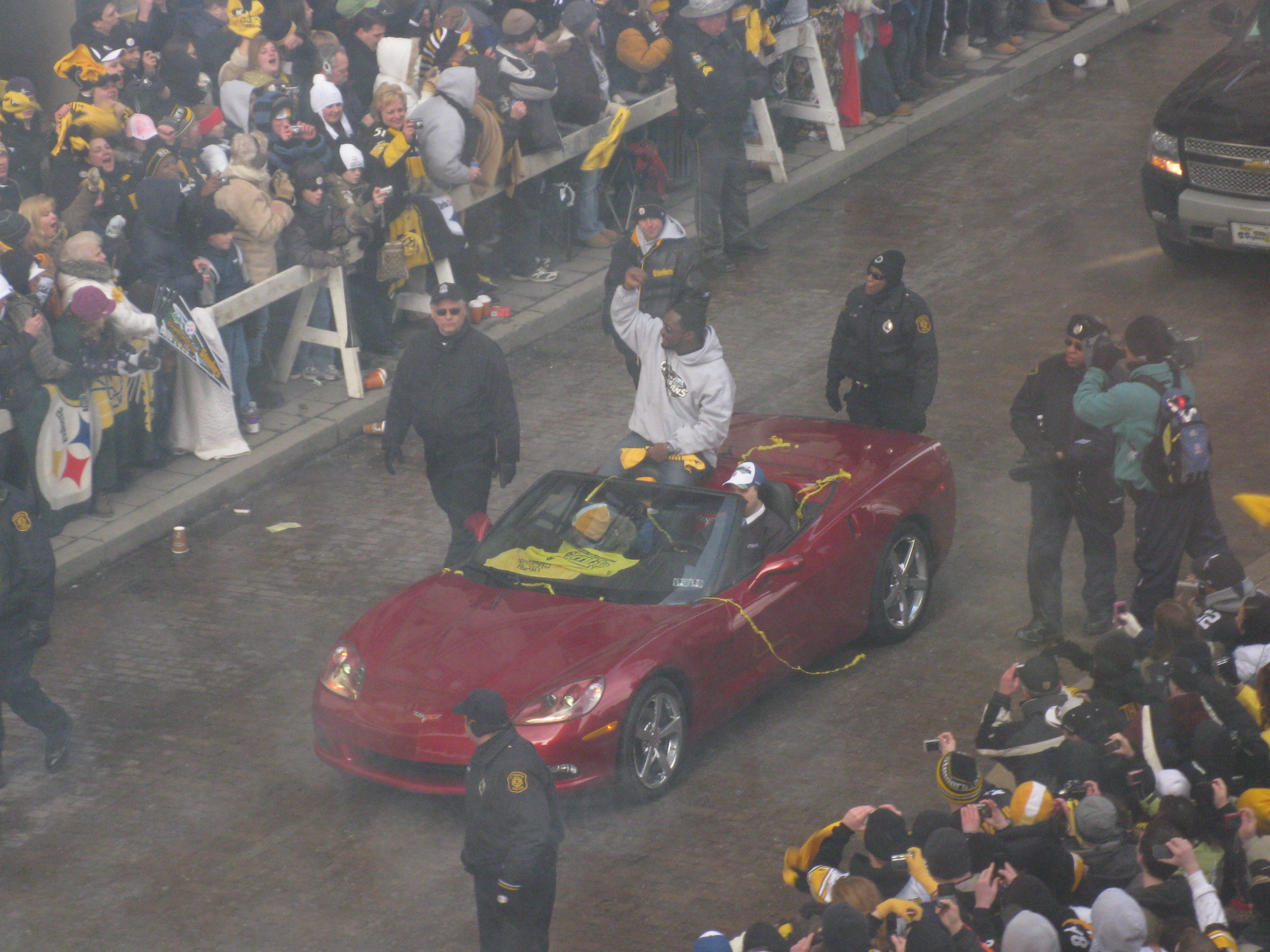
Tomlin in the victory parade after winning Super Bowl XLIII

When the Steelers defeated the Baltimore Ravens in the 2008 AFC Championship Game, Tomlin became the youngest NFL head coach to lead his team to a Super Bowl. He also became the third African-American to coach a team to the Super Bowl, following Chicago's Lovie Smith and Indianapolis's Tony Dungy, the two opposing coaches in Super Bowl XLI. On January 29, 2009, Tomlin was named the 2008 Motorola NFL Coach of the Year. Three days later, at age 36, he became the youngest head coach to win the Super Bowl when the Steelers defeated the Arizona Cardinals in Super Bowl XLIII by a score of 27–23. The previous record was held by Jon Gruden, who was 39 when he won Super Bowl XXXVII with the Tampa Bay Buccaneers. Coincidentally, Tomlin was the defensive backs coach under Gruden when the Buccaneers won the Super Bowl and was a key component in their success that year. Tomlin's record was later eclipsed by Sean McVay, who was 303 days younger when winning Super Bowl LVI.

==== Super Bowl XLV loss and Killer B's Era: 2010–2016 ====
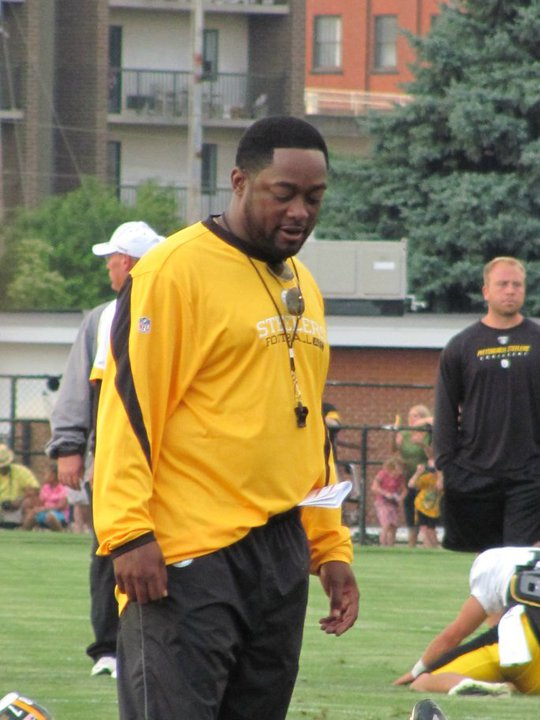
Tomlin at training camp in 2009

On July 13, 2010, Tomlin signed a three-year contract extension with the Steelers. That season, he coached the Steelers to a 12–4 record and led them to the Super Bowl for the second time in three years. In Super Bowl XLV, the Steelers lost to the Green Bay Packers by a score of 31–25.

On November 13, 2011, Tomlin won his 50th game as the Steelers' head coach with a 24–17 victory over the Cincinnati Bengals. Of the 16 head coaches in franchise history, Tomlin was the fourth to reach this milestone. The Steelers recorded another 12–4 regular season mark in the 2011 season. Their season ended in the Wild Card Round with a 29–23 overtime road loss to the Denver Broncos.

On July 24, 2012, Tomlin received a three-year contract extension through the 2016 season. The financial terms were not disclosed. In the 2012 season, the Steelers finished with an 8–8 record after struggling with injuries to quarterback Ben Roethlisberger and the offensive line while also adjusting to the system of new offensive coordinator Todd Haley. It was the second time the Steelers failed to make the playoffs under Tomlin's tenure as head coach.

Facing the Baltimore Ravens on November 28, 2013, in a primetime Thanksgiving Day game with major playoff implications, Tomlin became the subject of controversy when video replay showed him interfering with a kick return. With the Steelers trailing 13–7 in the third quarter, Tomlin stood just off the field along the visiting team's sideline as Baltimore's Jacoby Jones broke free on a kickoff return for a potential game-breaking touchdown. Tomlin, with his back to the approaching play, appeared to glance over his shoulder then place his foot briefly onto the field as he jumped out of the way, causing Jones to veer inside where he was tackled. Several Ravens players claimed Tomlin had intentionally interfered with Jones; if officials had agreed, a touchdown could have been awarded to the Ravens based on the palpably unfair act. However, no penalty was called for interference or for standing in the white border area reserved for the officiating crew. Whether it was intentional or not, Tomlin was widely criticized in the media. Following the game, Tomlin defended himself, stating he had simply wandered too close to the field while watching the play on the stadium's Jumbotron, a mistake he said coaches often make. The league subsequently announced it was investigating the matter, with the potential of a heavy fine and forfeited draft picks. On December 4, the NFL announced that they had fined Tomlin $100,000, and hinted it was considering stripping the Steelers of one or more draft picks because his actions affected the play on the field. The $100,000 fine was tied for the second-highest for a coach in NFL history and was also tied for the highest for a coach who does not also have the powers of general manager. Then-Minnesota Vikings head coach Mike Tice was fined $100,000 in 2005 for scalping Super Bowl tickets. Tomlin led the Steelers to another 8–8 record in the 2013 season, missing the postseason.

Tomlin led the Steelers to improvement in the 2014 season, going 11–5 and winning the AFC North. The team saw their season end during the Wild Card Round to the Baltimore Ravens in a 30–17 loss. The 2014 season saw the birth of the Killer B's era in which Roethlisberger along with wide receiver Antonio Brown and running back Le'Veon Bell all hit their primes.

In the 2015 season, Tomlin and the Steelers recorded a 10–6 record, which qualified the team for the postseason. The Steelers narrowly beat the Cincinnati Bengals on the road by a score of 18–16 in the Wild Card Round before losing to the eventual Super Bowl 50 champion Denver Broncos on the road by a score of 23–16 in the Divisional Round. Despite the season-ending loss to Denver, of the Broncos' three postseason opponents en route to their Super Bowl title, Pittsburgh's offense found the most success against Denver's top-ranked "No Fly Zone" defense as Roethlisberger was the only quarterback to not throw an interception, while Tom Brady threw two interceptions in the AFC Championship Game and Cam Newton threw one pick in Super Bowl 50. The Steelers committed just one turnover against the Broncos, compared to the New England Patriots committing two in the AFC Title Game and the Carolina Panthers turning it over four times in the Super Bowl. Pittsburgh also gained the most amount of total yards on offense with 396, with New England and Carolina recording 336 and 315 yards respectively, and also the greatest number of passing yards with 311, compared to the Patriots managing 229 yards through the air and the Panthers with 197 passing yards.

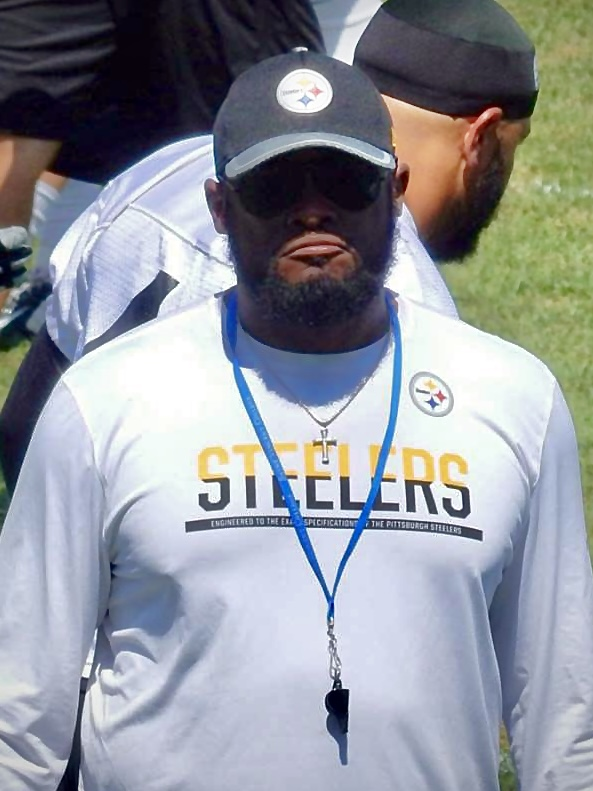
Tomlin during training camp in 2016

The 2016 season marked significant improvement for the Steelers. Tomlin led the team to an 11–5 record as they won seven straight games to finish the season. The Steelers finished atop the AFC North and defeated the Miami Dolphins 30–12 during the Wild Card Round and the Kansas City Chiefs on the road 18–16 in the Divisional Round. However, in their first AFC Championship Game since 2010, the Steelers lost on the road to the New England Patriots 36–17.

==== End of Roethlisberger era: 2017–2021 ====
In 2017, Tomlin and the Steelers went 13–3 and won the AFC North. Despite the successful regular season, the team went one-and-done in the playoffs, losing 45–42 to the Jaguars in the Divisional Round.

In 2019, starting quarterback Ben Roethlisberger suffered a season-ending elbow injury during a narrow Week 2 28–26 loss to the Seattle Seahawks. Although the Steelers began the season 0–3, they got their first win in a Week 4 27–3 victory over the Cincinnati Bengals on Monday Night Football. The Steelers lost their next game to the division-winning Baltimore Ravens in a 26–23 overtime loss. After the 1–4 start, the Steelers would go on a winning streak, winning their next four games straight going 5–4. After losing on the road to the Cleveland Browns by a score of 21–14 in Week 11, the Steelers won three more straight and were 8–5 and fighting for a playoff spot with the loss of Roethlisberger and multiple injuries on the offense. The Steelers would lose their final three games and finish the season with an 8–8 record in spite of multiple quarterback changes between Mason Rudolph and rookie undrafted free agent Devlin Hodges.

Following an incident in November 2019 where Cleveland Browns defensive end Myles Garrett struck quarterback Mason Rudolph with a helmet in the closing minutes of the game, he initially refused all media questions related to the scuffle. In the months following the incident, Garrett accused Rudolph of using a racial slur as an explanation for the fight. On February 17, 2020, Tomlin appeared on ESPN to be interviewed by Stephen A Smith to defend Rudolph against the accusations.

On November 6, 2020, Tomlin was fined US$100,000 by the NFL for not properly wearing a face mask, as required for coaches during the COVID-19 pandemic, during a Week 8 matchup in the 2020 NFL season. After Week 9, Tomlin recorded his 14th consecutive non-losing season since becoming a head coach, tying him with Marty Schottenheimer for the longest streak of all time. The Steelers finished the 2020 season with a 12–4 record but lost in the Wild Card Round of the playoffs to the Cleveland Browns by a score of 48–37. With the conclusion of the 2020 season, Tomlin was tied with Pete Carroll for 21st place on the NFL's all-time regular-season wins list with 145.

On April 20, 2021, Tomlin signed a three-year contract extension to remain the Steelers' head coach through 2024. Tomlin led the Steelers to a 9–7–1 record in the 2021 season. They made the playoffs but saw their season end during the Wild Card Round to the Kansas City Chiefs in a 42–21 road loss.

The 2021 season was particularly notable for Tomlin as it was the 18th and final season in which Ben Roethlisberger was under center for the Steelers. Since Tomlin's hiring in 2007, the Steelers posted a record of 137–70–1 in games in which Roethlisberger was the starter. Up until Roethlisberger's retirement in February 2022, Tomlin had only coached 95 games without him, achieving a record of 46–48–1.

==== Playoff struggles and resignation: 2022–2025 ====
The 2022 season was Tomlin's 16th with the team, passing predecessor Bill Cowher for the second-longest tenure as head coach of the Steelers. Week 14 marked the 32nd matchup between Tomlin and Baltimore Ravens head coach John Harbaugh, surpassing Curly Lambeau and Steve Owen for the second-most head-to-head matchups between head coaches in NFL history (the current record is held by Lambeau and George Halas with 49). Tomlin coached the Steelers to a 9–8 record in 2022, missing the playoffs. The 2023 season was Tomlin's 17th with the team, finishing 10–7, and losing to the Buffalo Bills on the road during the Wild Card Round, 31–17. Following the end of the season, Bill Belichick left his head coaching position with the Patriots, resulting in Tomlin becoming the league's most tenured head coach with a single team.

On June 10, 2024, Tomlin signed a three-year contract extension to remain the Steelers' head coach through the 2027 season, making him the second longest tenured Steelers head coach of all time, only behind Chuck Noll by three seasons. Tomlin achieved his 18th consecutive non-losing season with a Week 13 44–38 victory over the Cincinnati Bengals that brought the Steelers to a 9–3 record. During the 2024 season, Tomlin and the Steelers, along with the rest of the AFC North, had their season documented for the HBO Max series Hard Knocks. The Steelers ended the 2024 season going 10–7, finishing with a four-game losing streak going into the playoffs. They lost to the Baltimore Ravens 28–14 during the Wild Card Round.

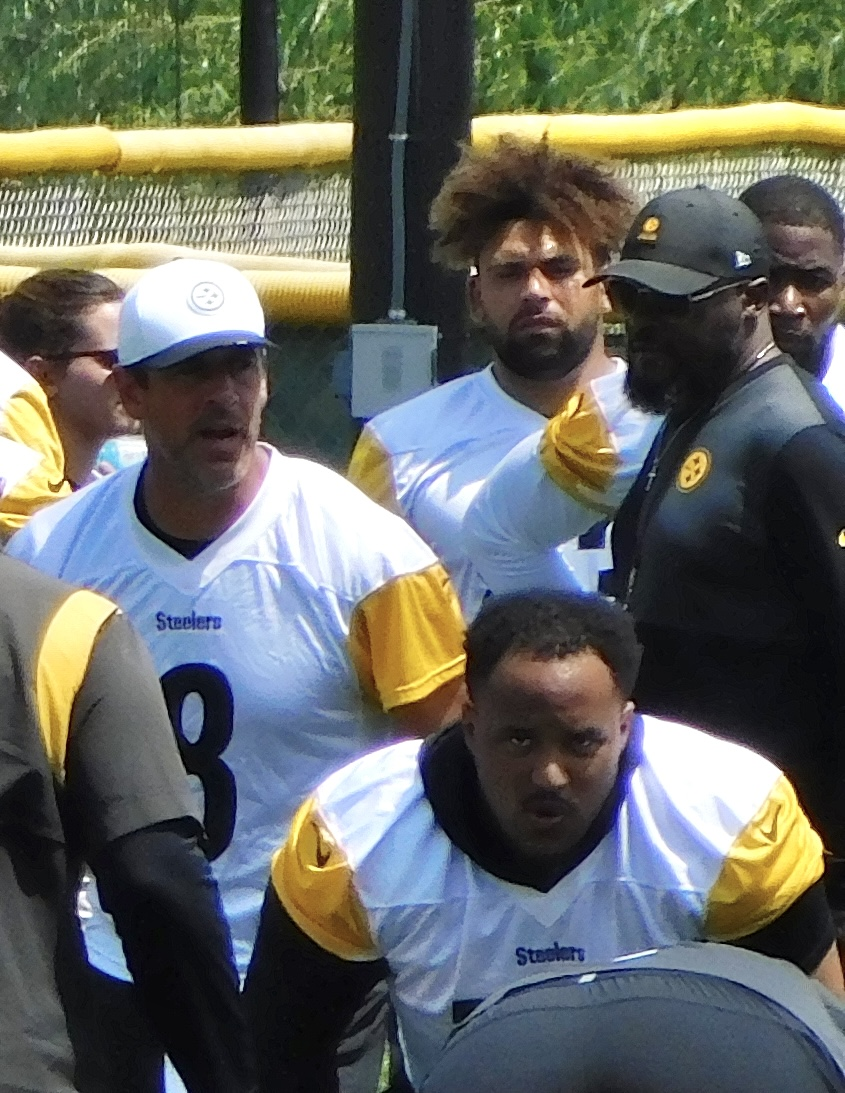
Tomlin watching as Aaron Rodgers directs the Steelers offense in 2025

Following the 2024 season, Tomlin faced significant criticism for his lack of postseason success. Since the team's 2016 AFC Championship Game appearance, the Steelers had yet to record a postseason victory, making Tomlin the coach with second longest playoff win drought in NFL history only behind Marvin Lewis. Calls to fire Tomlin were silenced by Steelers owner Art Rooney II, who confirmed that there were no plans to fire Tomlin. The team declined to trade Tomlin to the Chicago Bears in January 2025.

Following the retirement of the NBA's San Antonio Spurs head coach Gregg Popovich on May 3, 2025, Tomlin became the longest tenured head coach in the big four of American sports. Tomlin led the Steelers to a 3–1 record to begin the 2025 season heading into their Week 5 bye. The Steelers held first place in the AFC North until a Week 12 loss to the Bears dropped their record to 6–5, giving up their position to the Baltimore Ravens and falling into the #8-seed in the AFC. After defeating the Detroit Lions in Week 16, Tomlin achieved his 19th consecutive season without a losing record as the Steelers set a franchise record 22 consecutive non-losing seasons. Despite the earlier setbacks in the season, Tomlin and the Steelers found themselves in a win-and-in scenario during the Week 18 matchup against their division rival, the Ravens. The game ended with a missed field goal from Ravens rookie kicker Tyler Loop, giving the Steelers a narrow 26–24 victory and sent Tomlin to his third consecutive postseason appearance as well as clinching his first AFC North title since the 2020 season. It was his 193rd victory as head coach, tying him with Chuck Noll for the most in franchise history. This marked the 40th and final matchup between Tomlin and Harbaugh, as Harbaugh was fired by the Ravens on January 6, 2026.

Tomlin and the Steelers ended the 2025 season with a 30–6 loss to the Houston Texans at home during the Wild Card Round. This marked Tomlin's seventh consecutive postseason loss, extending the Steelers playoff win drought to 10 years, a franchise worst. With the loss, Tomlin tied Marvin Lewis for the most consecutive playoff losses in NFL history.

On January 13, 2026, it was announced that Tomlin resigned as head coach after 19 seasons with the Steelers. Tomlin finished his tenure in Pittsburgh with a 193–114–2 (.628) regular-season record and an 8–12 (.400) playoff record for a combined record of 201–126–2 (.614). This made the NBA's Miami Heat head coach Erik Spoelstra the longest tenured head coach in the four North American major professional sport leagues.

== Tomlinisms ==
Throughout his tenure with the Steelers, Tomlin became known for creating memorable motivational quotes, often referred to as "Tomlinisms". These phrases are typically concise, metaphorical, and aimed at reinforcing a specific mindset or message about the team and give insight into Tomlin's coaching philosophy. Over time, these phrases became part of Steelers culture, with players adopting them as guiding principles and fans celebrating them as reflections of Tomlin's personality.

One of his most iconic phrases, "the standard is the standard", is an early example of a Tomlinism. This mantra became particularly notable during the 2010 season when the Steelers reached Super Bowl XLV following multiple early season struggles. This quote became so widely used to represent the Steelers organization that the team had it engraved on the locker room walls at Heinz Field in 2013. In preparing for a 2011 game against the Browns, Tomlin emphasized containing wide receiver Josh Cribbs, remarking that "we've been dead Indians in his cowboy movie enough". Some of Tomlin's quotes are meant to inspire his team and fans such as "Don't blink, if you're a blinker, cut your eyelids off", "We don’t live in our fears", and "If our team doesn't face enough adversity early on in a season, I create it. Nothing builds a team like adversity."

After a Week 16 comeback victory over the Indianapolis Colts in 2020, Tomlin stated: "It's a fine line between drinking wine and squashing grapes." After 2024's 13–6 victory over the Denver Broncos in Week 2, when asked about whether or not former Broncos quarterback and then current Steelers starter Russell Wilson was given the game ball from the victory, Tomlin replied: "I can't give you all the ingredients to the hot dog, you might not like it."

After a 2025 Week 18 victory over the Baltimore Ravens to give the Steelers the #4-seed in the playoffs, Tomlin told reporters, "If my aunt had male parts, she would be my uncle." This came after Tomlin was asked about Tyler Loop's missed field goal at the end of the game to give Pittsburgh the win.

== Coaching style ==
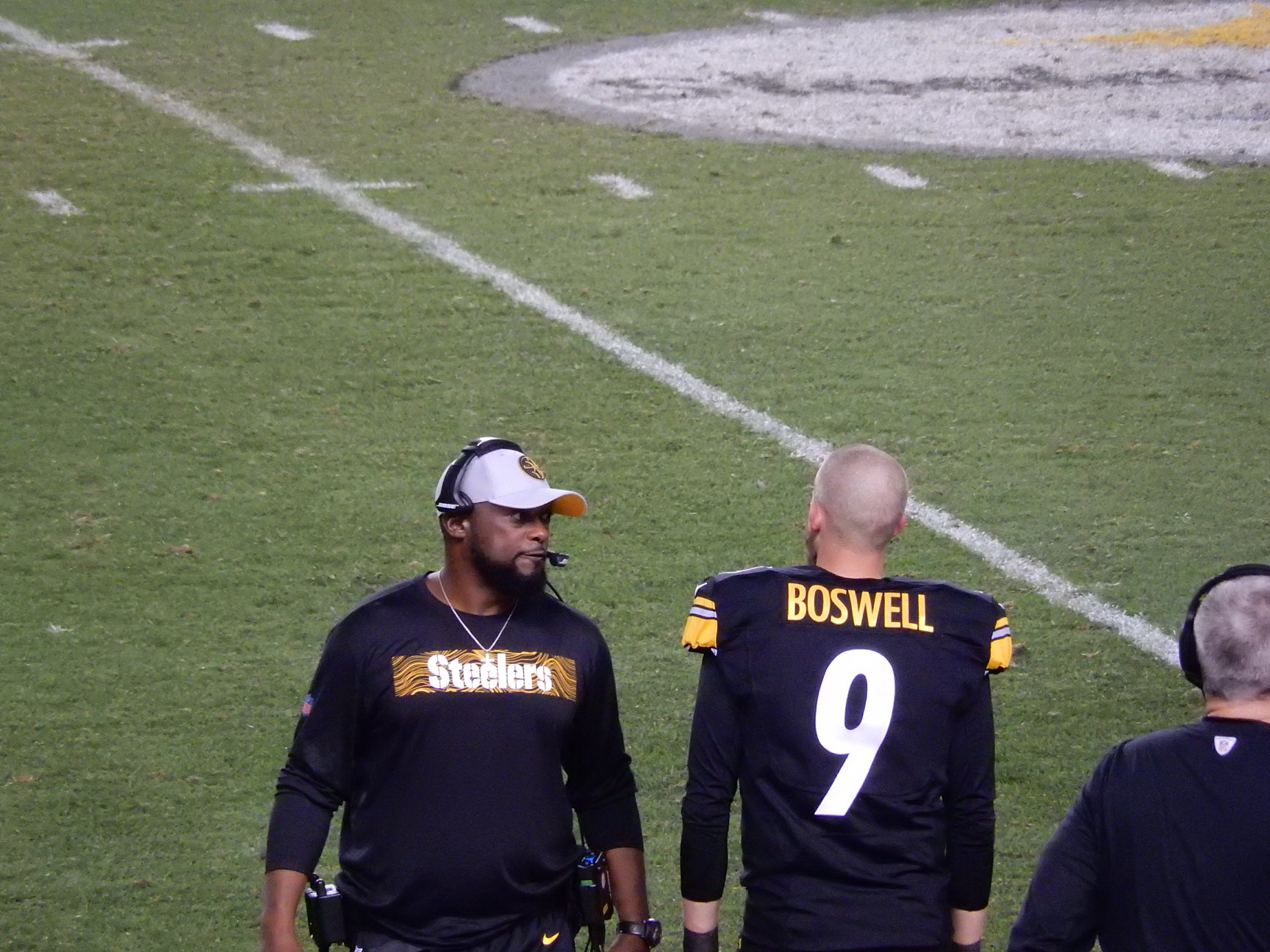
Tomlin with kicker Chris Boswell during a 2018 preseason game

Tomlin is recognized for fostering strong relationships with his players, often being described as a "player's coach." This term reflects his ability to connect with athletes on a personal level, understanding their perspectives and motivations. During a 2024 interview, running back Najee Harris highlighted Tomlin's rapport with the team, noting, "It's not like that in other places." Tomlin's approach involves open communication with the team and granting players autonomy while maintaining discipline. Tomlin has invited multiple players to spend holidays with him and his family. In 2023, George Pickens and Broderick Jones celebrated Thanksgiving with Tomlin.

In the 2024 season of HBO's Hard Knocks: In Season with the AFC North, a candid interaction between Tomlin and cornerback Joey Porter Jr. was captured in the debut episode. Following a game against the Cincinnati Bengals in which Porter accumulated six penalties, Tomlin addressed his performance. He acknowledged Porter's potential by stating, "You're gonna be great, but you ain't gonna be great today", emphasizing the importance of growth and learning from mistakes.

Tomlin's approach has drawn criticism at times, notably when former Steelers quarterback and Hall of Fame member Terry Bradshaw referred to him as "more of a cheerleader guy" than coach during a 2016 interview. The 2018 season was plagued by locker room conflicts involving wide receiver Antonio Brown and running back Le’Veon Bell, highlighting discipline challenges under Tomlin's leadership. Bell's season-long holdout over a contract dispute created a major distraction and drew frustration from teammates. Meanwhile, Brown's issues, including disputes with quarterback Ben Roethlisberger and skipping practices, culminated in his benching for the season finale and eventual offseason trade to the Oakland Raiders. Critics argued these incidents reflected a lack of accountability in Tomlin's player-friendly approach, despite his strengths in fostering camaraderie.

However, defenders of Tomlin point out that he tends to have a higher tolerance for such behavior than other coaches, and knows when to cut ties with a player. Tomlin's near decade-long employment of the aforementioned Brown has often been cited as a prime example, as Brown would be released by the Raiders and Patriots in the following season after his departure (playing a combined one game between the two teams), then saw his NFL career come to an end when Brown abruptly walked out on his last NFL team (Tampa Bay, then coached by former Tomlin assistant Bruce Arians) in the middle of a game. The Steelers' unexpected trade of Diontae Johnson in 2024 also vindicated Tomlin's style, as Johnson would be traded or released from four more teams (including two of the Steelers division rivals) within the following year.

== Head coaching record ==
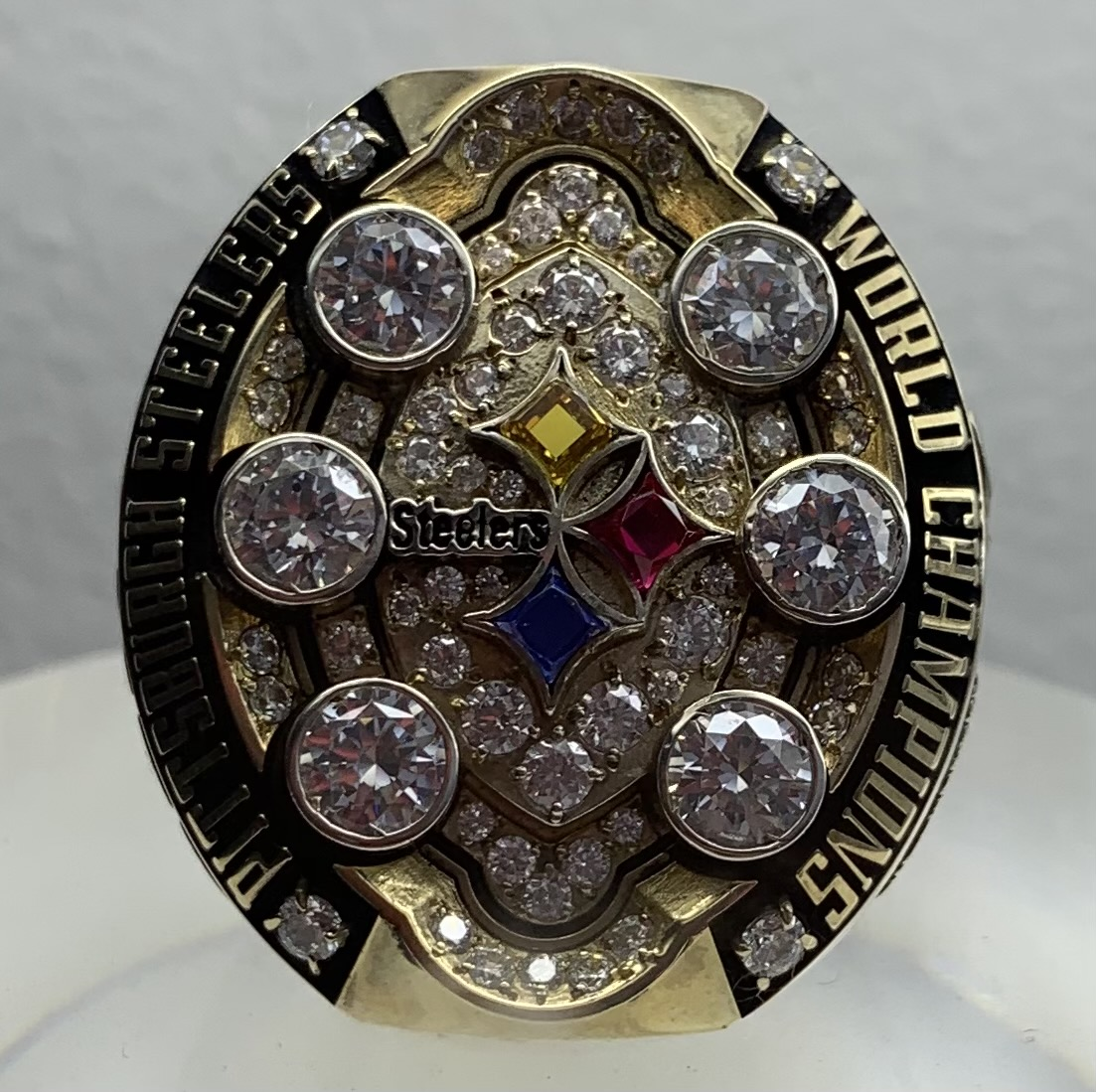
The Steelers' Super Bowl XLIII ring, the sixth won in franchise history

Team	Year	Regular season					Postseason			
Team	Year	Won	Lost	Ties	Win %	Finish	Won	Lost	Win %	Result
PIT	2007	10	6	0	.625	1st in AFC North	0	1	.000	Lost to Jacksonville Jaguars in AFC Wild Card Game
PIT	2008	12	4	0	.750	1st in AFC North	3	0	1.000	Super Bowl XLIII champions
PIT	2009	9	7	0	.563	3rd in AFC North	—	—	—	—
PIT	2010	12	4	0	.750	1st in AFC North	2	1	.667	Lost to Green Bay Packers in Super Bowl XLV
PIT	2011	12	4	0	.750	2nd in AFC North	0	1	.000	Lost to Denver Broncos in AFC Wild Card Game
PIT	2012	8	8	0	.500	3rd in AFC North	—	—	—	—
PIT	2013	8	8	0	.500	2nd in AFC North	—	—	—	—
PIT	2014	11	5	0	.688	1st in AFC North	0	1	.000	Lost to Baltimore Ravens in AFC Wild Card Game
PIT	2015	10	6	0	.625	2nd in AFC North	1	1	.500	Lost to Denver Broncos in AFC Divisional Game
PIT	2016	11	5	0	.688	1st in AFC North	2	1	.667	Lost to New England Patriots in AFC Championship Game
PIT	2017	13	3	0	.813	1st in AFC North	0	1	.000	Lost to Jacksonville Jaguars in AFC Divisional Game
PIT	2018	9	6	1	.594	2nd in AFC North	—	—	—	—
PIT	2019	8	8	0	.500	2nd in AFC North	—	—	—	—
PIT	2020	12	4	0	.750	1st in AFC North	0	1	.000	Lost to Cleveland Browns in AFC Wild Card Game
PIT	2021	9	7	1	.559	2nd in AFC North	0	1	.000	Lost to Kansas City Chiefs in AFC Wild Card Game
PIT	2022	9	8	0	.529	3rd in AFC North	—	—	—	—
PIT	2023	10	7	0	.588	3rd in AFC North	0	1	.000	Lost to Buffalo Bills in AFC Wild Card Game
PIT	2024	10	7	0	.588	2nd in AFC North	0	1	.000	Lost to Baltimore Ravens in AFC Wild Card Game
PIT	2025	10	7	0	.588	1st in AFC North	0	1	.000	Lost to Houston Texans in AFC Wild Card Game
Total		193	114	2	.628		8	12	.400	

== Coaching tree ==
Three of Tomlin's coaching assistants have become head coaches in the NFL, NCAA or USFL:

- Bruce Arians, Arizona Cardinals (2013–2017), Tampa Bay Buccaneers (2019–2021)
- Todd Haley, Tampa Bay Bandits (2022), Memphis Showboats (2023)
- Scottie Montgomery, East Carolina (2016–2018)

== Broadcasting career ==
On April 26, 2026, NBC Sports announced that Tomlin would join the panel of Football Night in America beginning in the 2026 NFL season.

== Personal life ==
Tomlin met his wife, Kiya, while they were students at the College of William & Mary, where Kiya was a gymnast. They have three children together: Dino, who played football at Maryland and Boston College, Mason, who played football at Columbia, and Harley, who is a gymnast at Georgia.

Tomlin is a Christian who attends a Christian and Missionary Alliance church.

In September 2026, Tomlin was inspired by his son to start a YouTube channel to show off his Minecraft world that he has spent 12 years building. As of October 14, 2026, Tomlin's channel has accumulated over 137,000 subscribers.

In an October 2026, Tomlin revealed that he is “probably” on the autism spectrum, although he has not sought a formal diagnosis.

== See also ==
- List of National Football League head coaches with 50 wins
- List of Super Bowl head coaches
