= Judd Davis =

American former football player

No. 6
- Position: Kicker

Personal information
- Born: c. 1973 (age 52–53); Ocala, Florida, U.S.

Career information
- High school: Forest (Ocala)
- College: Florida (1991–1994)

Awards and highlights
- Lou Groza Award (1993); First-team All-American (1993); First-team All-SEC (1994); University of Florida Athletic Hall of Fame

Judd Dillon Davis (born c. 1973) is an American former football kicker who played for the Florida Gators, where he won the Lou Groza Award.

== Early life ==
Davis grew up in Ocala, Florida and he attended Forest High School, playing high school football for the Forest Wildcats as both punter and kicker. During his high school senior season, he completed seven of eight field goals attempts, with a long of 49 yards, and averaged over 40 yards per punt.

== College career ==
Davis attended the University of Florida, where he played for coach Steve Spurrier's Florida Gators football team from 1991 to 1994. He was initially a walk-on player and saw no game action until his sophomore season in 1992. During his junior season in 1993, he completed fifteen of nineteen (78.95%) field goal attempts, and forty-seven of forty-nine (95.92%) extra point attempts. Memorably, he completed four of four attempted field goals and three of three extra point attempts, and providing the Gators' winning margin in their 33–26 victory over the Georgia Bulldogs in wet field conditions. In addition to winning the Lou Groza Award in 1993, Davis received first-team All-American honors. He received first-team All-SEC honors as a senior in 1994.

During his three-season college career, Davis set or tied eight school records and three SEC records. In 1994, he surpassed former Gators running back Emmitt Smith to become the Gators' all-time leading scorer with 225 career points. Including bowl games, Davis completed nearly 87% of his field goal attempts (33 of 38) inside of 50 yards. He completed two of four attempts longest than 50 yards, including a career long of 52 year against the Ole Miss Rebels in 1994. On point-after-touchdown attempts, he completed 129 of 131 extra points, a new team record.

Davis graduated from Florida with a bachelor's degree in American studies in 1995. He was inducted into the University of Florida Athletic Hall of Fame as a "Gator Great" in 2011.

== Personal life ==
He now lives in Ocala, Florida and has two children, Connor and Maggie Davis. Davis, along with former Gator teammate Chris Doering, played jai alai matches at Ocala Poker and Jai Alai, without an audience or wagering, in order to satisfy Florida licensing requirements for the facility's card room.

== Career accomplishments ==
- Won the 1993 Lou Groza Award given annually to the top collegiate kicker in nation
- Set or tied 8 school records and 3 SEC records
- First-team All-American in 1993
- Tied the SEC single-season record for points by a kicker: 107
- SEC record for PATs made in a season (65) and made a school record (81) consecutive PAT attempts
- Florida all-time leading scorer: 225
- Inducted into the UF Athletic Hall of Fame in 2011

== See also ==
- Florida Gators
- Florida Gators football, 1990–99
- List of Florida Gators football All-Americans
- List of University of Florida alumni
- List of University of Florida Athletic Hall of Fame members
