= Ocala Gainesville Poker =

Casino and former Jai Alai fronton located in Orange Lake, Florida

Coordinates: 29.4142°N 82.2016°W

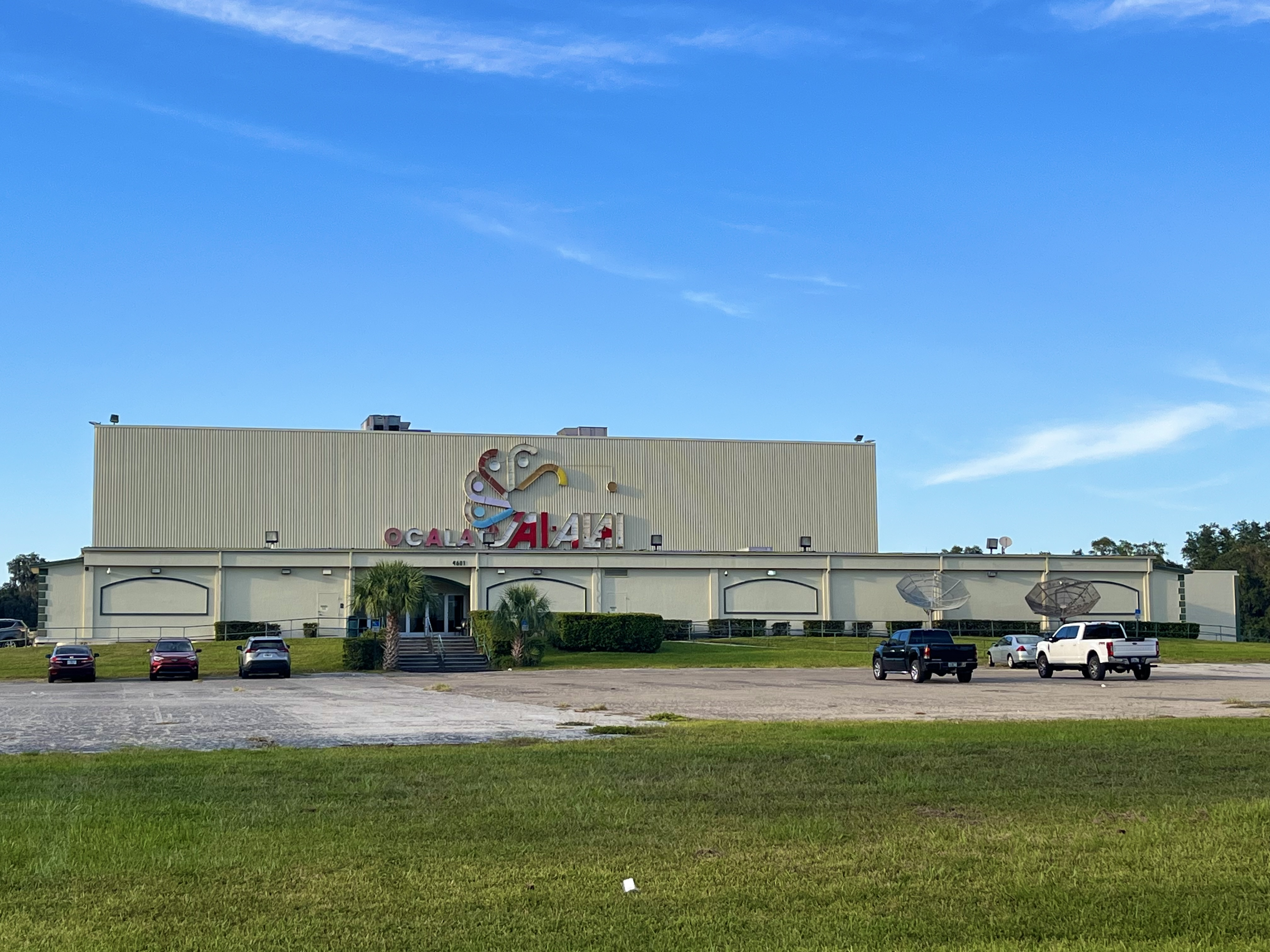
- Exterior view, September 2023
- Interactive map of Ocala Gainesville Poker
- Location: 4601 W Hwy 318 Orange Lake, FL 32681
- Opened: 1973
- Closed: October 28, 2023
- Casino type: Land-based
- Owner: Ocala Breeders’ Sales
- Website: https://www.ocalagainesvillepoker.com/

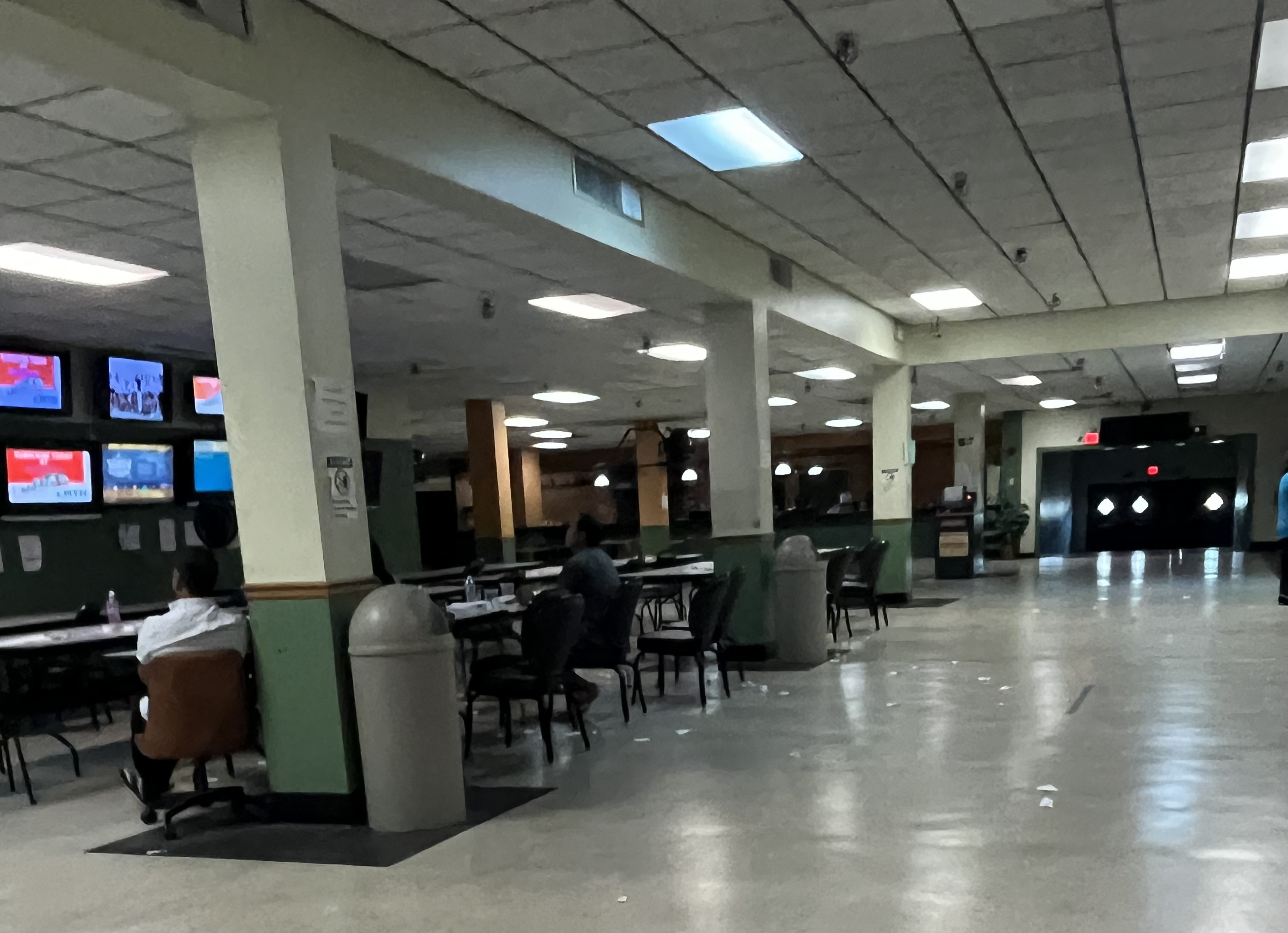
Interior view, September 2023

Ocala Gainesville Poker was a casino and former Jai Alai fronton located in Orange Lake, Florida (some sources say Reddick, Florida), that specialized in poker tournaments and live poker games. It was located midway between Ocala and Gainesville. The facility had 28 poker tables and 18 large plasma TVs that could be customized to display preferred sporting events or tracks for Inter Track Wagering (ITW) such as horse or dog races. The casino offered tableside massages at a rate of $1 per minute. A bar and café was available on-site. Hosting private parties and tournaments was available at the venue. The establishment also had a jai alai team when in season. The facility was 60,000 square feet and on a 50-acre property.

The institution was first established in 1973 as Ocala Jai-alai, which was a branch office of the Miami fronton. At one time, the jai alai performances could attract about 2,000 people. However, jai alai declined in popularity, so in 2008 the name was changed to Ocala Poker & Jai Alai with the focus shifted to poker.

Due to the decline in popularity of jai alai, Ocala Gainesville Poker along with other frontons in Florida held matches as few as thirty days a year to satisfy the requirement to maintain its gambling license. They held forty performances (twenty matinee and twenty night performances) of eight games each to fulfill its legal requirements, but the performances were done behind curtains so as not to distract the poker tables. The jai alai season generally was in February and March.

Previously the fronton would have ten to twelve players, but by 2014, they used the same two non-professional players, former University of Florida football players Chris Doering and Judd Davis. The casino generated profit through other means, such as poker. It had been criticized particularly by those in the jai alai community for holding low quality jai alai matches with non-professional players.

Second Chance Jai Alai operated the business until it defaulted on its rent and other agreements in 2017. At that, time the Ocala Breeders’ Sales (OBS) group who had purchased the property in July 2000 took over the operation and renamed it to Ocala Gainesville Poker.

Ocala Gainesville Poker permanently closed on October 28, 2023 to help facilitate the new poker room in the region, Ocala Bets, also owned by OBS.
