= Ed Tomlin =

American football player

No. 23
- Position: Running back

Personal information
- Born: June 7, 1947; Ocala, Florida, U.S.
- Died: January 16, 2012 (aged 64); Ocala, Florida, U.S.
- Listed height: 6 ft 1 in (1.85 m)
- Listed weight: 225 lb (102 kg)

Career information
- High school: Howard (Ocala)
- College: Hampton (1964–1968)
- NFL draft: 1968: 10th round, 270th overall pick

Career history
- Baltimore Colts (1968)*; Montreal Alouettes (1968)
- * Offseason or practice squad member only

Career CFL statistics
- Games played: 8
- Carries: 61
- Rushing yards: 265
- Receptions: 12
- Receiving yards: 119
- Kick returns: 9
- Return yards: 208
- Fumbles: 2

Edward Tomlin (June 7, 1947 – January 16, 2012) was an American former professional football running back. He played college football at Hampton. He was selected by the Baltimore Colts in the 10th round (270th overall) of the 1968 NFL/AFL draft. He was also a member of the Montreal Alouettes.

He was also a longtime civil rights activist and former president of the Marion County, Florida NAACP.

== Early life ==
Tomlin was born June 7, 1947, in Ocala, Florida. He played football at Howard High School and became a civil rights activist at the age of 13 and protested segregation in Ocala as a member of the NAACP Youth Council in the 1960s. He then attended Hampton Institute where he majored in chemistry. He later developed a chemical formula used to paint bicycle frames so they would reflect light at night.

In 2024, Tomlin was inducted into the Hampton University Hall of Fame.

== Playing career ==
While at Hampton, under head coach Mel Labat, Tomlin led the Pirates in scoring three straight seasons, 1965–1967. In 1965 he scored a total of 30 points, 66 points for 1966, and 67 in 1967. In his career, the Pirates went 11–15.

He was selected in the tenth round (270th overall) of the 1968 NFL/AFL draft by the Baltimore Colts of the National Football League (NFL). However, after a bidding war between the Colts and the Montreal Alouettes of the Canadian Football League (CFL), he signed with Montreal.

In Montreal, he appeared in eight games, where he carried the ball 61 times for 265 yards. He also recorded 12 receptions for 119 yards, 9 kickoff returns for 208 yards, and he also fumbled twice.

After eight games, Tomlin retired due to an ankle injury.

== Post-playing career ==
After retiring from football, according to his sister Alice, Tomlin and a friend started a paint company. In the mid-1990s he returned to his hometown of Ocala, Florida and worked as a business manager for various local businesses. Then, in 2003, he became the head of the Marion County, Florida chapter of the NAACP, a position he held until 2006, when he resigned for health reasons.

== Personal life ==
Tomlin had been married to his wife Mazella Tomlin for 12 years at the time of his death. He was the father of Pittsburgh Steelers head coach Mike Tomlin.

On June 7, 2012, after returning from a day of fishing, while speaking with his brother, Michael, Tomlin collapsed and died of an apparent heart attack.
