= Killer B's (Pittsburgh) =

American football offensive trio

The Killer B's, in the context of the Pittsburgh Steelers, refer to the era from the 2013 Pittsburgh Steelers season to the 2017 Pittsburgh Steelers season when three offensive players were in their prime: Antonio Brown, Le'Veon Bell, and Ben Roethlisberger, all of whom have initials beginning with the letter 'B'. Sometimes, this group included placekicker Chris Boswell due to his accuracy, this was cemented in a playoff win where Boswell accounted for all of the Steelers points. The group is considered to be one of the most talented offensive trios in the history of the Steelers and "one of the most dynamic, unstoppable assemblages of offensive talent the league has ever seen". However, they never saw serious success, reaching only three playoff games in their six years together.

== History ==
=== Acquisition of Roethlisberger ===
In the 2003 season, under head coach Bill Cowher, the Steelers finished with a 6-10 record, their worst since 1988. The team was spearheaded by quarterback Tommy Maddox, who started all 16 games for the team in 2003. Maddox was not a particularly inspiring quarterback for the team as he had finished 2003 throwing just 18 touchdowns against 17 interceptions. He also possessed one of the lowest pass completions in the league at 57.4%.

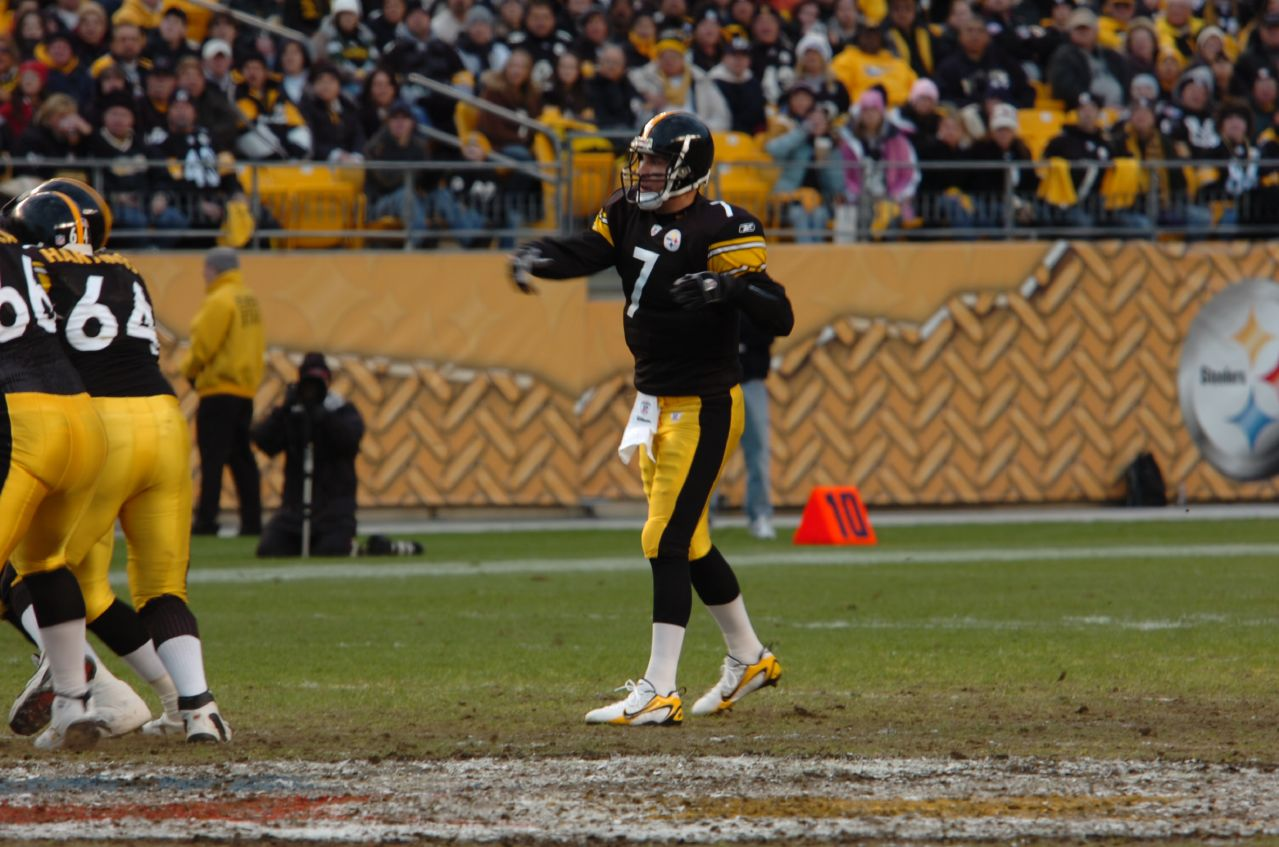
Roethlisberger throwing pass at Heinz Field in 2006

Maddox was a long line of quarterbacks that had started for the Steelers since the 1983 retirement of franchise cornerstone Terry Bradshaw. Due to the team's poor record, they held the 11th overall pick in the 2004 NFL draft. Initially, Cowher did not believe any of the major quarterback prospects (Eli Manning, Philip Rivers, Ben Roethlisberger) would fall to the Steelers and decided to take Shawn Andrews, an offensive guard, to build around Maddox and backup Charlie Batch. Once Roethlisberger fell to the 11th pick, Steelers owner Dan Rooney overrode Cowher's decision to draft Andrews and submitted the pick for Roethlisberger.

Roethlisberger became the team's starter the following season after injuries to Maddox and Batch early in the season and led the team to a 15-1 record as a rookie, leading them to an AFC championship appearance. The following season, Roethlisberger led them to a win in Super Bowl XL, their first Super Bowl title since Super Bowl XIV in 1979. Over the next three seasons, Roethlisberger led Pittsburgh to a combined record of 29-17 even through the head coaching shift from Cowher to Mike Tomlin in 2007. In 2008, Roethlisberger led the Steelers yet again on a playoff run that culminated in a Super Bowl victory yet again. After his second Super Bowl campaign, Roethlisberger led the team to a record of 9-7 in 2009.

=== Antonio Brown and Super Bowl XLV ===
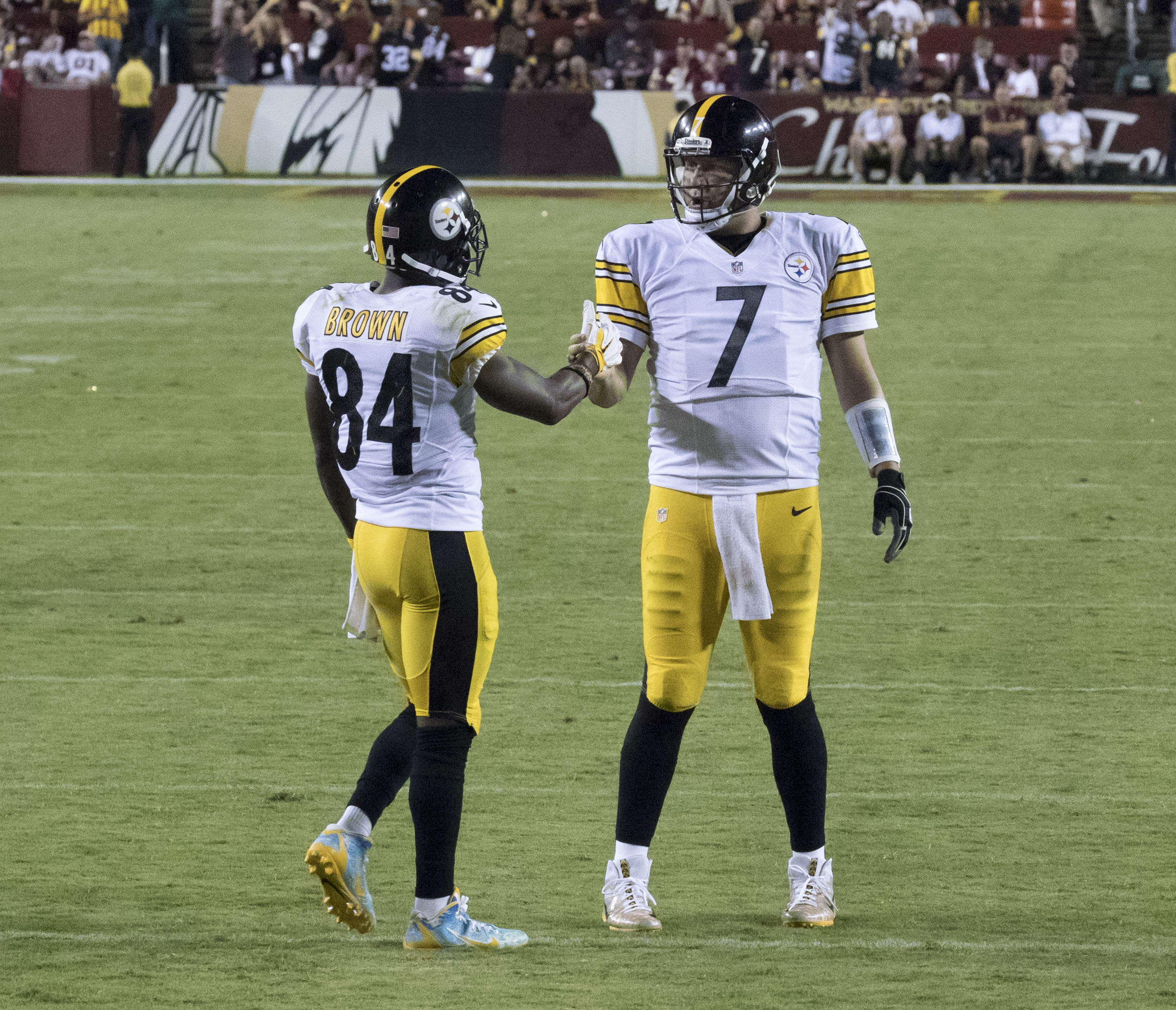
Brown and Roethlisberger before a game in Washington D.C.

Throughout the 2000s, the Steelers' wide receiver one was Hines Ward, who became the team's Super Bowl MVP in their 2005 victory. Ward began to age out of the role, giving way to younger receivers such as Santonio Holmes and Mike Wallace. In the 2010 offseason, the Steelers traded away Holmes to the New York Jets In exchange for a fifth round pick. The team, needing a replacement for Holmes, drafted Antonio Brown in the sixth round with the 195th overall pick in the 2010 NFL draft.

Brown had a quiet rookie season, however, he and Roethlisberger along with the Steelers, advanced to Super Bowl XLV which the team lost to the Green Bay Packers. In both 2011 and 2012, the tandem of Roethlisberger and Brown became difficult for opposing defenses to stop. With Ward's retirement in 2011, Brown saw his production increase. Brown reached his first 1,000 yard season in 2011 with 1,108 yards. He followed this season by achieving 787 yards and five touchdowns in 2012. His eight touchdowns between these two seasons accounted for 17% of Roethlisberger's touchdown passes in those two seasons alone.

Though the connection of Roethlisberger to Brown intensified, there was little postseason success to show for the duo. In 2011, the Steelers had a first round exit in the playoffs when they were defeated by the Denver Broncos and missed the playoffs all together in 2012.

=== Addition of Le'Veon Bell ===
In 2013, the Steelers drafted running back Le'Veon Bell in the second round of the 2013 NFL draft. The selection of Bell is what began the Killer B's era in Pittsburgh. Roethlisberger ended the season ranked seventh in passing yards, eighth in touchdowns, and 10th in completion percentage, with his 92.0 passer rating placing him 12th in the league for the 2013 season. He specifically targeted Brown 165 times, leading to 110 receptions for 1,499 yards and 8 touchdowns. This accounted for roughly 28% of Roethlisberger's 584 pass attempts that year. While he was primarily a "power back" in the Steelers' offense and not a receiver, Roethlisberger still targeted Bell 66 times, resulting in 45 catches for 399 yards, though Bell did not record any receiving touchdowns.

== Killer B's era (2014-2017) ==
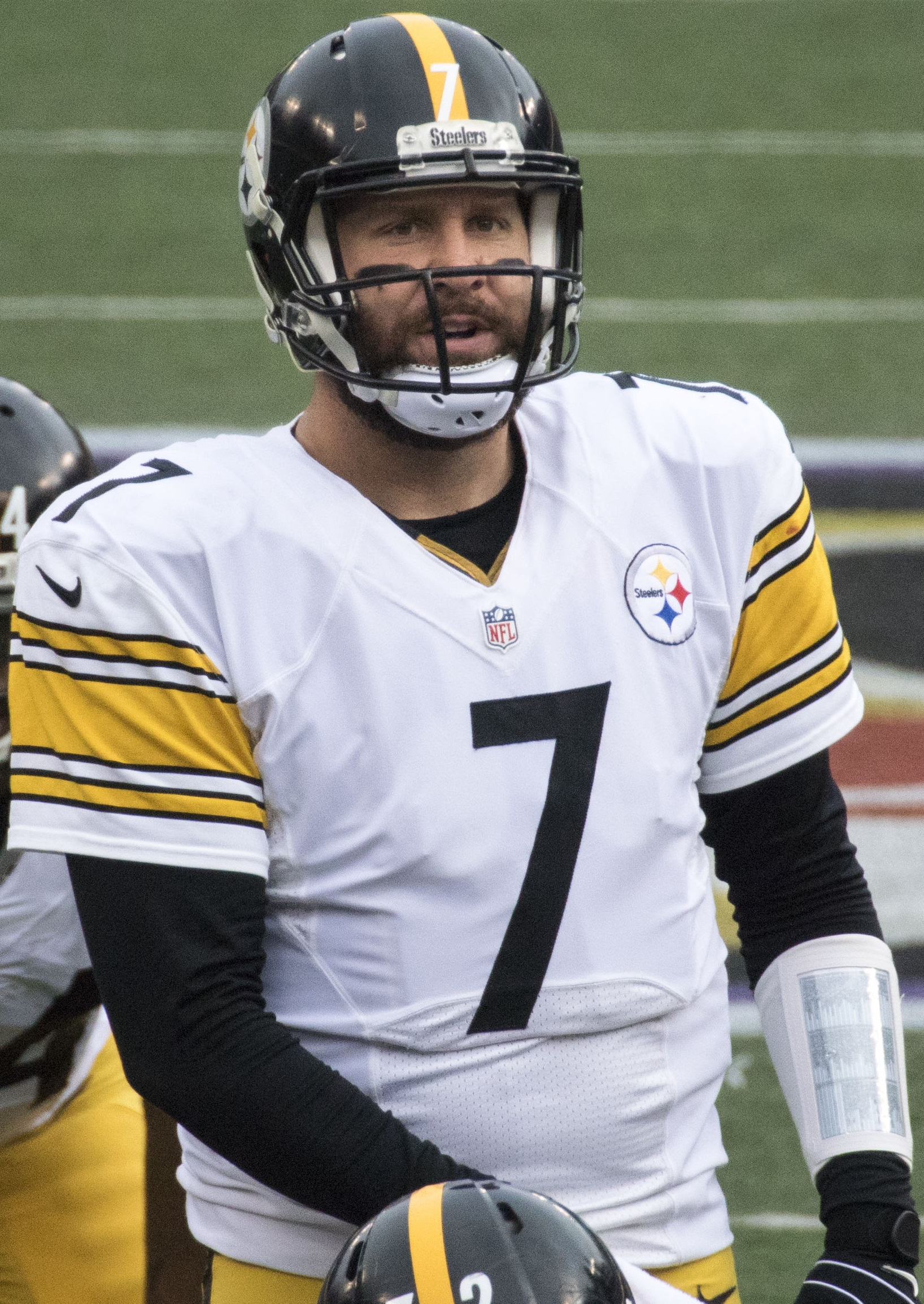
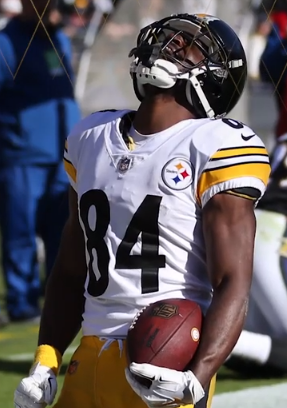
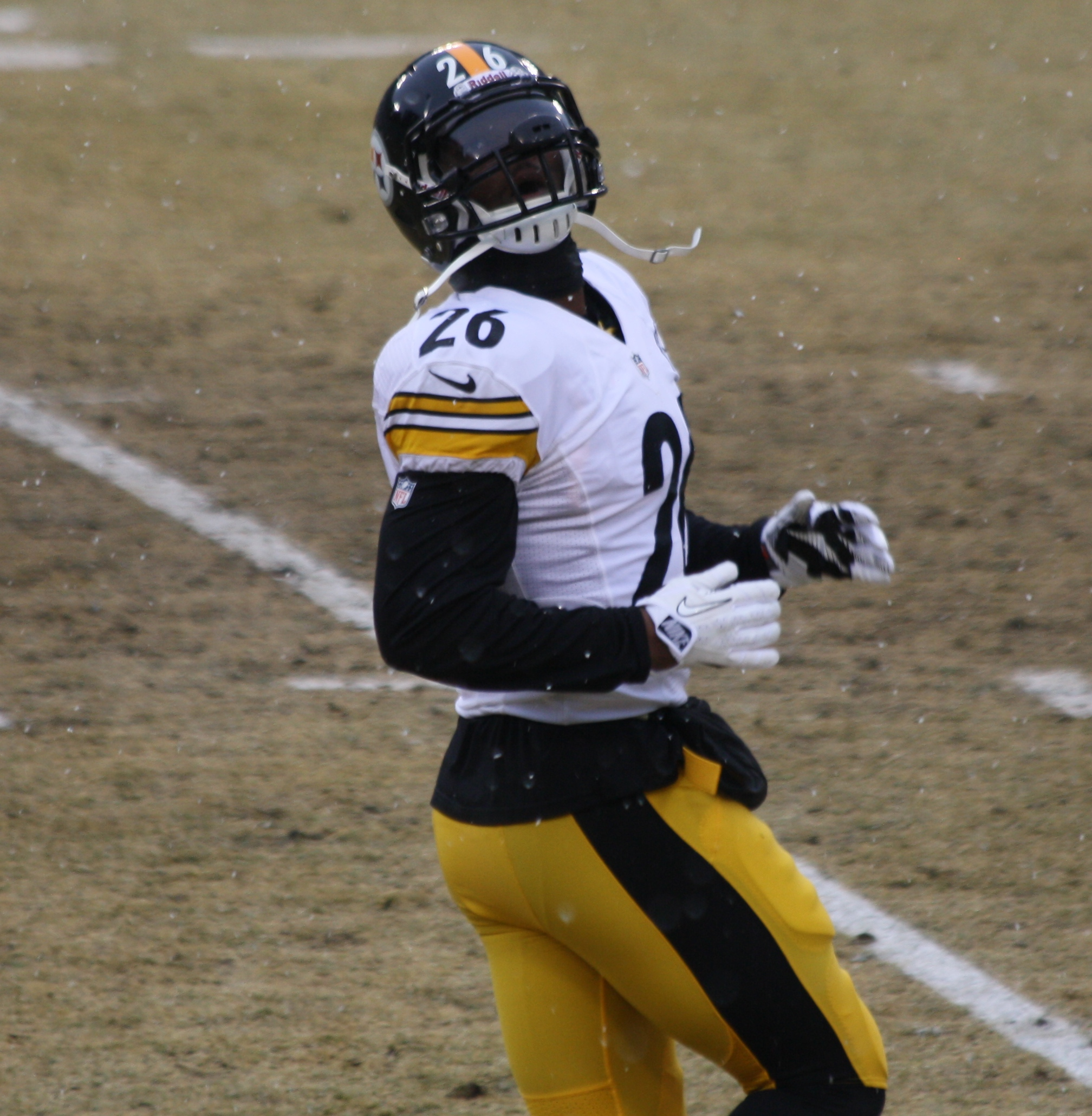
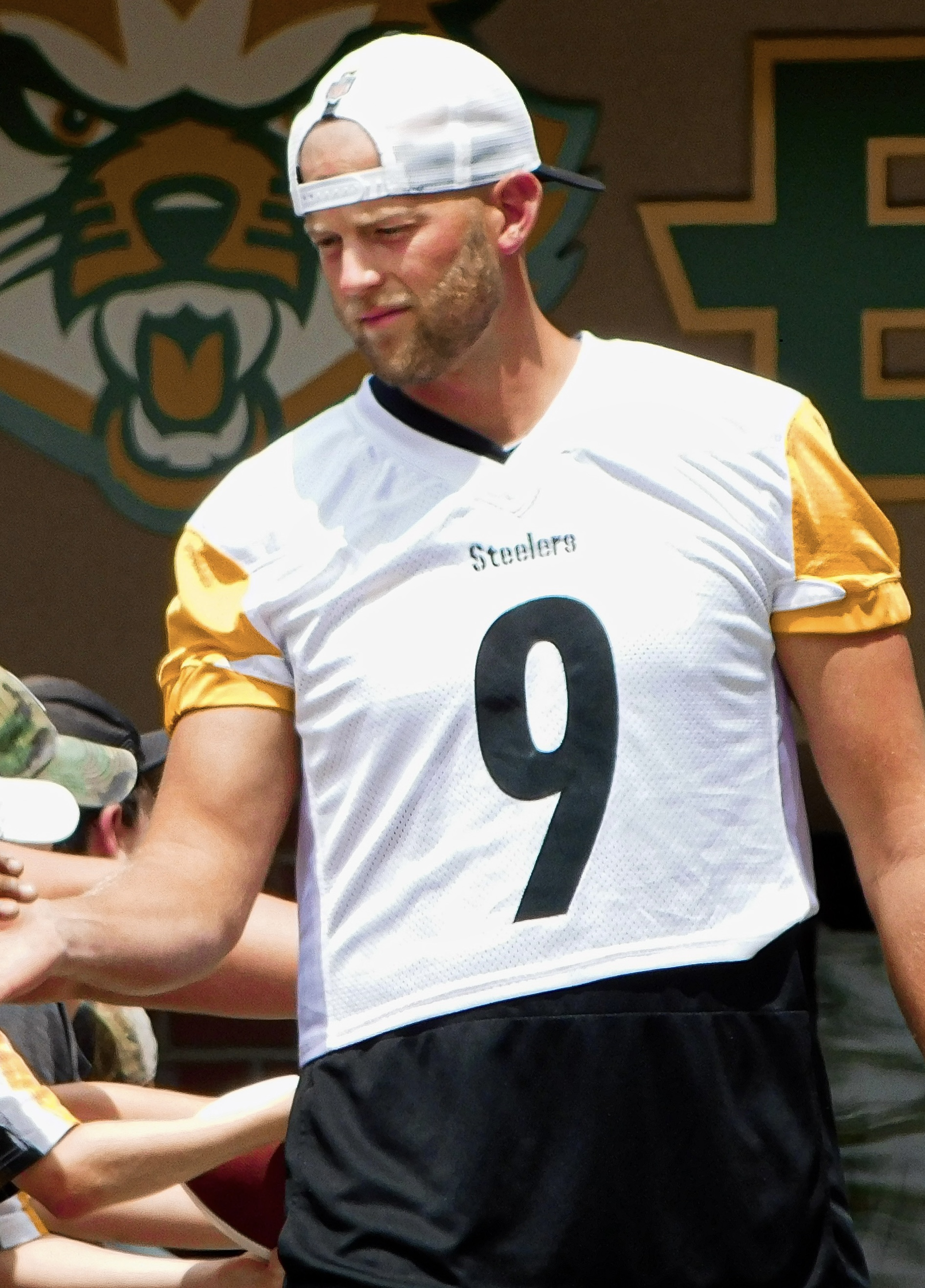
Clockwise: Ben Roethlisberger, Antonio Brown, Chris Boswell, Le'Veon Bell

During this period, Roethlisberger passed for over 4,000 yards in three of the four seasons, including a career-high 4,952 yards in 2014. He also threw for 29 or more touchdowns each season, with a peak of 32 in 2014. Antonio Brown emerged as one of the NFL’s most dominant wide receivers, posting six consecutive 100-catch seasons from 2013 to 2018, four of which coincided with Bell's time on the roster. In 2014, Brown led the league in receptions (129) and receiving yards (1,698) while adding 13 touchdowns. Over the four years, Brown recorded 7,347 receiving yards and 52 touchdowns.

Le’Veon Bell brought versatility to the Steelers' offense, combining his patience as a runner with exceptional pass-catching ability. In 2014, Bell set career highs with 1,361 rushing yards and 854 receiving yards, becoming just the second player in NFL history at the time to record over 1,350 rushing yards and 850 receiving yards in a single season. Bell accounted for over 2,000 total scrimmage yards in both 2014 and 2016, finishing second in MVP voting in 2014. Across his career with the Steelers, Bell averaged 129 yards from scrimmage per game, the highest in NFL history.

The Steelers’ offense, anchored by the "Killer B's," consistently ranked among the NFL's best. In 2014, they finished second in total offense, averaging 411.1 yards per game. The team won the AFC North title in 2014, 2016, and 2017, advancing to the AFC Championship Game in the 2016 season. In that game, Roethlisberger threw for 314 yards and a touchdown, but the Steelers fell to the New England Patriots, 36-17.

Undrafted free agent Chris Boswell served as the Pittsburgh Steelers' primary placekicker during the "Killer B's" era, joining the team in the 2015 season after injuries to Shaun Suisham. In his first season, he converted 29 of 32 field goal attempts, achieving a 90.6% success rate. His performance earned him the nickname "The Wizard of Boz." In 2017, Boswell was selected to the Pro Bowl after making 35 of 38 field goals (92.1%) and 37 of 39 extra points. Over his first three seasons, he maintained a field goal percentage above 84%.

Playoff success, however, remained elusive for the trio. Despite their dominance in the regular season, injuries and inconsistent performances hindered their postseason runs. Bell, in particular, faced injuries in critical games, including missing the 2014 AFC Wild Card Game and leaving the 2016 AFC Championship Game due to a groin injury. Brown also missed the 2015 AFC Divisional Round after suffering a concussion in the previous round.

=== Disbandment ===
Pittsburgh's Killer B's era ended after Bell refused to sign the franchise tag of which was placed on him during the 2017 season, and while still technically on the roster, did not play and sat out the entire season. After Bell left in free agency during the 2018 offseason, Brown would be traded to the Oakland Raiders, but would be cut before the 2019 season started. Brown would then sign with the Patriots, though his tenure there only lasted one game before he was cut. After leaving the Patriots, Brown would rejoin Tom Brady in Tampa Bay, where they both won Super Bowl LV. Roethlisberger would remain a Steeler until his retirement following the 2021 season. As of 2026, Boswell remains the Steelers' placekicker. He was named a First-Team All-Pro,and finished as the NFL scoring leader in 2024.This was the end of an era and one of the Steelers most dominant runs in the modern time.
