= Nancy Duffy Blount =

American politician

Nancy Duffy Blount is an American politician, state legislator in Arkansas, businesswoman and former coroner. She is an African American Democrat and served in the Arkansas House of Representatives from 2005 until 2010. She lived in Marianna, Arkansas.

Previously she served as coroner in Lee County, Arkansas for eight years. In 2018, she campaigned for a seat in the Arkansas House, facing off against Reginald Murdock.
