= John Eason =

American football wide receiver (born 1945)

No. 82, 78, 75
- Position: Wide receiver

Personal information
- Born: July 30, 1945 (age 81); Ocala, Florida, U.S.
- Listed height: 6 ft 2 in (1.88 m)
- Listed weight: 220 lb (100 kg)

Career information
- High school: Howard (Ocala)
- College: Florida A&M (1964-1967)
- NFL draft: 1968: 9th round, 244th overall pick

Career history

Playing
- Oakland Raiders (1968); Spokane Shockers (1968); BC Lions (1969); Buffalo Bills (1970)*; Montreal Alouettes (1972)
- * Offseason or practice squad member only

Operations
- Florida A&M (2017–2019) Athletic director
- Stats at Pro Football Reference

John Eason (born July 30, 1945) is an American former professional football player who was a wide receiver in the American Football League (AFL) and Canadian Football League (CFL). He graduated from Howard High School, a segregated high school in Ocala, Florida, in 1963. He played for the Oakland Raiders in 1968, the BC Lions in 1969 and for the Montreal Alouettes in 1972. He was the athletic director of Florida A&M University from 2017 to 2019. Eason earned bachelor's and master's degrees at FAMU and a Ph.D. in educational administration From Florida State University in 1987.

From 1981 to 1994, Eason coached at FSU, as well as earning a Ph.D. and serving as assistant athletic director for academic and student affairs. From 1995 to 1998, he was offensive coordinator and wide receivers coach at the University of South Carolina. From 1999 to 2000 he worked as an assistant professor in the Department of Human Service and Wellness at the University of Central Florida. In 2001 he joined Mark Richt at the University of Georgia as wide receivers coach and assistant head coach. From 2005 to 2008 he was associate head coach at UGA before becoming director of football operations in 2009, then director of player development in 2010.
