= Howard High School (Florida) =

Former segregated school in Ocala, Florida

Coordinates: 29.1983°N 82.1525°W

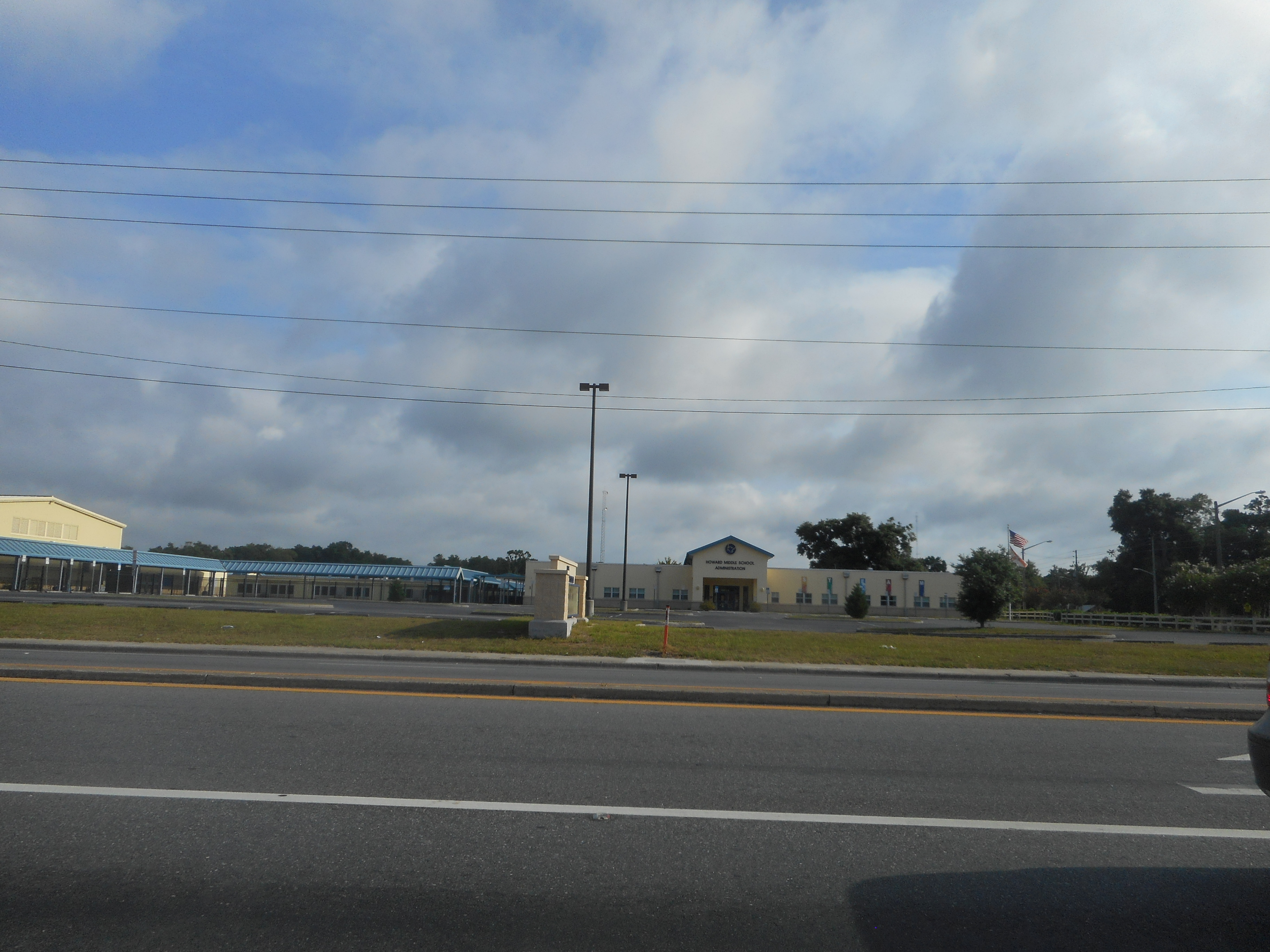
Howard Middle School (formerly Howard High School) as seen from US 27 in June 2019.

Howard High School was a segregated black school in Ocala, Florida. It closed in 1969, after the public schools were integrated in 1968. It is now a middle school.

== History ==
The school was built as Howard Academy in 1866 on land donated by James H. Howard, a former slaveowner, on the corner of Osceola and Third streets. The building burned down in 1887, and a new school was built the next year at the corner of Adams and Bay, which is now Northwest Second Street and Northwest Seventh Avenue, at a cost of $1600. The teachers and additional financial support and the teachers came from the Freedmen's Bureau. The school was named after Union Army General Oliver Otis Howard, who was the first and only director of the Freedmen's Bureau. Until 1880, the teachers were all white; then, black teachers took over. In 1914 a two-story, twenty room building was constructed at a cost of $7,000. High school was added in 1927. The building burned again in 1935, and was replaced with a new brick building. For years, books were provided after students were finished with them at the white schools. In 1955, a new high school building was built, with grades 4-8 remaining at the old school.

In 1965, some students from Howard began attending all-white Ocala High School (now Forest under a choice plan. In 1968, some white students began to attend the school. In 1969 it closed. In 2002 it was added to the National Register of Historic Places.

The athletics teams were known as the Wild Bulls.

== Notable people ==
- John Eason, Professional football player, professor, coach, athletic director
- Gene Milton, Professional football player and runner
