= Political party strength in Arkansas =

Politics in the US state of Arkansas

The following table indicates the party of elected officials in the U.S. state of Arkansas:

- Governor
- Lieutenant Governor
- Secretary of State
- Attorney General
- State Auditor
- State Treasurer
- State Land Commissioner

The table also indicates the historical party composition in the:

- State Senate
- State House of Representatives
- State delegation to the United States Senate
- State delegation to the United States House of Representatives

For years in which a United States presidential election was held, the table indicates which party's nominees received the state's electoral votes.

== Pre-statehood (1819–1836) ==
Year	Executive offices			General Assembly		U.S. Congress
Year	Governor	Sec. of Terr.	Treasurer	Senate	House	Delegate
1819	Robert Crittenden (DR) (Note: Acting territorial governor. As secretary of Arkansas Territory from 1819 to 1829, Crittenden served as acting governor whenever the appointed governor was not in the state. This meant he was in fact the first person to be governor of the territory, since James Miller did not arrive in the territory until nine months after his appointment.)	Robert Crittenden (DR)	James Scull	[?]	[?]	James Woodson; Bates (I)
1819	James Miller (I) (Note: President James Monroe appointed Miller territorial governor on March 3, 1819, the same date the bill organizing Arkansaw Territory was signed. However, to avoid the hot southern summer, he delayed his departure from New Hampshire until September and took a non-direct route, finally arriving in the territory on December 26, 1819.) (Note: Resigned citing poor health. At the time of his resignation, he had been absent from the territory for 18 months.)	Robert Crittenden (DR)	James Scull	[?]	[?]	James Woodson; Bates (I)
1820	James Miller (I)	Robert Crittenden (DR)	James Scull	[?]	[?]	James Woodson; Bates (I)
1821	James Miller (I)	Robert Crittenden (DR)	James Scull	[?]	[?]	James Woodson; Bates (I)
1822	James Miller (I)	Robert Crittenden (DR)	James Scull	[?]	[?]	James Woodson; Bates (I)
1823	James Miller (I)	Robert Crittenden (DR)	James Scull	[?]	[?]	Henry W. Conway (DR)
1824	James Miller (I)	Robert Crittenden (DR)	James Scull	[?]	[?]	Henry W. Conway (DR)
1824	Robert Crittenden (DR) (Note: Territorial Governor George Izard did not arrive in Arkansas Territory until May 31, 1825; Crittenden, Secretary of the territory, acted as governor in his stead, though Crittenden himself was out of the territory when Izard arrived.)	Robert Crittenden (DR)	James Scull	[?]	[?]	Henry W. Conway (DR)
1825	Robert Crittenden (DR)	Robert Crittenden (DR)	James Scull	[?]	[?]	Henry W. Conway (DR)
1825	George Izard (DR) (Note: Died in office.)	Robert Crittenden (DR)	James Scull	[?]	[?]	Henry W. Conway (DR)
1826	George Izard (DR)	Robert Crittenden (DR)	James Scull	[?]	[?]	Henry W. Conway (DR)
1827	George Izard (DR)	Robert Crittenden (DR)	James Scull	[?]	[?]	Ambrose H. Sevier (J)
1828	George Izard (DR)	Robert Crittenden (DR)	James Scull	[?]	[?]	Ambrose H. Sevier (J)
1828	vacant (Note: The office was vacant from November 22, 1828, until March 9, 1829. By the time notice of Izard's death reached Washington, D.C., Andrew Jackson had been elected president, and the U.S. Senate refused to approve Adams' choice for governor, preferring to wait until Jackson took office.)	Robert Crittenden (DR)	James Scull	[?]	[?]	Ambrose H. Sevier (J)
1829	vacant	[?]	James Scull	[?]	[?]	Ambrose H. Sevier (J)
1829	John Pope (J)	[?]	James Scull	[?]	[?]	Ambrose H. Sevier (J)
1830	John Pope (J)	[?]	James Scull	[?]	[?]	Ambrose H. Sevier (J)
1831	John Pope (J)	[?]	James Scull	[?]	[?]	Ambrose H. Sevier (J)
1832	John Pope (J)	[?]	James Scull	[?]	[?]	Ambrose H. Sevier (J)
1833	John Pope (J)	[?]	Samuel Morton Rutherford	[?]	[?]	Ambrose H. Sevier (J)
1834	John Pope (J)	[?]	Samuel Morton Rutherford	[?]	[?]	Ambrose H. Sevier (J)
1835	John Pope (J)	[?]	Samuel Morton Rutherford	[?]	[?]	Ambrose H. Sevier (J)
1835	William S. Fulton (J)	[?]	Samuel Morton Rutherford	[?]	[?]	Ambrose H. Sevier (J)
1836	William S. Fulton (J)	[?]	Samuel Morton Rutherford	[?]	[?]	Ambrose H. Sevier (J)

== 1836–1874 ==
Year	Executive offices						General Assembly		United States Congress			Electoral votes
Year	Governor	Lt. Governor	Sec. of State	Attorney General	Auditor	Treasurer	State Senate	State House	U.S. Senator (Class II)	U.S. Senator (Class III)	U.S. House	Electoral votes
1836	James Sevier; Conway (D)	no such office	Robert A. Watkins	no such office	Elias Nelson; Conway (D)	W. E. Woodruff	12D, 5W	35D, 18W, 1?	William S. Fulton (J)	Ambrose H. Sevier (J)	Archibald Yell (J)	Van Buren/ Johnson (D) ✓
1837	James Sevier; Conway (D)	no such office	Robert A. Watkins	no such office	Elias Nelson; Conway (D)	W. E. Woodruff	12D, 5W	35D, 18W, 1?	William S. Fulton (D)	Ambrose H. Sevier (D)	Archibald Yell (D)	Van Buren/ Johnson (D) ✓
1838	James Sevier; Conway (D)	no such office	Robert A. Watkins	no such office	Elias Nelson; Conway (D)	John Hutt	12D, 5W	35D, 18W, 1?	William S. Fulton (D)	Ambrose H. Sevier (D)	Archibald Yell (D)	Van Buren/ Johnson (D) ✓
1839	James Sevier; Conway (D)	no such office	Robert A. Watkins	no such office	Elias Nelson; Conway (D)	John Hutt	D majority	D majority	William S. Fulton (D)	Ambrose H. Sevier (D)	Edward Cross (D)	Van Buren/ Johnson (D) ✓
1840	James Sevier; Conway (D)	no such office	Robert A. Watkins	no such office	Elias Nelson; Conway (D)	John Hutt	D majority	D majority	William S. Fulton (D)	Ambrose H. Sevier (D)	Edward Cross (D)	Van Buren (D) ✗
1841	Archibald Yell (D) (Note: Resigned to run for the United States House of Representatives, winning the election.)	no such office	D. B. Greer	no such office	A. Boileau	John Hutt	16D, 5W	42D, 22W	William S. Fulton (D)	Ambrose H. Sevier (D)	Edward Cross (D)	Van Buren (D) ✗
1841	Archibald Yell (D)	no such office	D. B. Greer	no such office	Elias N. Conway (D)	John Hutt	16D, 5W	42D, 22W	William S. Fulton (D)	Ambrose H. Sevier (D)	Edward Cross (D)	Van Buren (D) ✗
1842	Archibald Yell (D)	no such office	John Winfrey	no such office	Elias N. Conway (D)	John Hutt	16D, 5W	42D, 22W	William S. Fulton (D)	Ambrose H. Sevier (D)	Edward Cross (D)	Van Buren (D) ✗
1843	Archibald Yell (D)	no such office	D. B. Greer	Robert Ward; Johnson (D)	Elias N. Conway (D)	J. C. Martin	15D, 6W	45D, 20W, 1?	William S. Fulton (D)	Ambrose H. Sevier (D)	Edward Cross (D)	Van Buren (D) ✗
1844	Archibald Yell (D)	no such office	D. B. Greer	Robert Ward; Johnson (D)	Elias N. Conway (D)	J. C. Martin	15D, 6W	45D, 20W, 1?	Chester Ashley (D)	Ambrose H. Sevier (D)	Edward Cross (D)	Polk/ Dallas (D) ✓
1844	Samuel Adams (D) (Note: As president of the Senate, acted as governor for unexpired term.)	no such office	D. B. Greer	Robert Ward; Johnson (D)	Elias N. Conway (D)	J. C. Martin	15D, 6W	45D, 20W, 1?	Chester Ashley (D)	Ambrose H. Sevier (D)	Edward Cross (D)	Polk/ Dallas (D) ✓
1845	Thomas S. Drew (D) (Note: Resigned due to the low salary he received as governor.)	no such office	D. B. Greer	Robert Ward; Johnson (D)	Elias N. Conway (D)	Samuel Adams (D)	21D, 4W	62D, 13W	Chester Ashley (D)	Ambrose H. Sevier (D)	Archibald Yell (D)	Polk/ Dallas (D) ✓
1846	Thomas S. Drew (D)	no such office	D. B. Greer	Robert Ward; Johnson (D)	Elias N. Conway (D)	Samuel Adams (D)	21D, 4W	62D, 13W	Chester Ashley (D)	Ambrose H. Sevier (D)	Archibald Yell (D)	Polk/ Dallas (D) ✓
1847	Thomas S. Drew (D)	no such office	D. B. Greer	Robert Ward; Johnson (D)	Elias N. Conway (D)	Samuel Adams (D)	22D, 3W	52D, 23W	Chester Ashley (D)	Ambrose H. Sevier (D)	Thomas W. Newton (W)	Polk/ Dallas (D) ✓
1847	Thomas S. Drew (D)	no such office	D. B. Greer	Robert Ward; Johnson (D)	Elias N. Conway (D)	Samuel Adams (D)	22D, 3W	52D, 23W	Chester Ashley (D)	Ambrose H. Sevier (D)	Robert Ward; Johnson (D)	Polk/ Dallas (D) ✓
1848	Thomas S. Drew (D)	no such office	D. B. Greer	George C. Watkins	Elias N. Conway (D)	Samuel Adams (D)	22D, 3W	52D, 23W	William K. Sebastian (D)	Solon Borland (D)	Robert Ward; Johnson (D)	Cass/ Butler (D) ✗
1849	Thomas S. Drew (D)	no such office	D. B. Greer	George C. Watkins	C. C. Danley	William Adams	20D, 5W	56D, 19W	William K. Sebastian (D)	Solon Borland (D)	Robert Ward; Johnson (D)	Cass/ Butler (D) ✗
1849	Richard C. Byrd (D) (Note: As president of the state Senate, acted as governor until special election.)	no such office	D. B. Greer	George C. Watkins	C. C. Danley	John H. Crease	20D, 5W	56D, 19W	William K. Sebastian (D)	Solon Borland (D)	Robert Ward; Johnson (D)	Cass/ Butler (D) ✗
1849	John Selden; Roane (D) (Note: Elected in a special election to fill unexpired term.)	no such office	D. B. Greer	George C. Watkins	C. C. Danley	John H. Crease	20D, 5W	56D, 19W	William K. Sebastian (D)	Solon Borland (D)	Robert Ward; Johnson (D)	Cass/ Butler (D) ✗
1850	John Selden; Roane (D)	no such office	D. B. Greer	George C. Watkins	C. C. Danley	John H. Crease	20D, 5W	56D, 19W	William K. Sebastian (D)	Solon Borland (D)	Robert Ward; Johnson (D)	Cass/ Butler (D) ✗
1851	John Selden; Roane (D)	no such office	D. B. Greer	John J. Clendenin	C. C. Danley	John H. Crease	21D, 4W	50D, 25W	William K. Sebastian (D)	Solon Borland (D)	Robert Ward; Johnson (D)	Cass/ Butler (D) ✗
1852	John Selden; Roane (D)	no such office	D. B. Greer	John J. Clendenin	C. C. Danley	John H. Crease	21D, 4W	50D, 25W	William K. Sebastian (D)	Solon Borland (D)	Robert Ward; Johnson (D)	Pierce/ King (D) ✓
1853	Elias N. Conway (D)	no such office	D. B. Greer	John J. Clendenin	C. C. Danley	John H. Crease	19D, 6W	48D, 27W	William K. Sebastian (D)	vacant	2D	Pierce/ King (D) ✓
1853	Elias N. Conway (D)	no such office	D. B. Greer	John J. Clendenin	C. C. Danley	John H. Crease	19D, 6W	48D, 27W	William K. Sebastian (D)	Robert Ward; Johnson (D)	2D	Pierce/ King (D) ✓
1854	Elias N. Conway (D)	no such office	D. B. Greer	John J. Clendenin	C. C. Danley	John H. Crease	19D, 6W	48D, 27W	William K. Sebastian (D)	Robert Ward; Johnson (D)	2D	Pierce/ King (D) ✓
1855	Elias N. Conway (D)	no such office	D. B. Greer	John J. Clendenin	A. S. Huey	A. H. Rutherford (D)	17D, 8W	57D, 15W, 3I	William K. Sebastian (D)	Robert Ward; Johnson (D)	2D	Pierce/ King (D) ✓
1856	Elias N. Conway (D)	no such office	D. B. Greer	Thomas Johnson	A. S. Huey	A. H. Rutherford (D)	17D, 8W	57D, 15W, 3I	William K. Sebastian (D)	Robert Ward; Johnson (D)	2D	Buchanan/ Breckinridge (D) ✓
1857	Elias N. Conway (D)	no such office	D. B. Greer	Thomas Johnson	William R. Miller (D)	John H. Crease	21D, 2KN, 1AW, 1W	65D, 9KN, 1W	William K. Sebastian (D)	Robert Ward; Johnson (D)	2D	Buchanan/ Breckinridge (D) ✓
1858	Elias N. Conway (D)	no such office	D. B. Greer	J. L. Hollowell	William R. Miller (D)	John H. Crease	21D, 2KN, 1AW, 1W	65D, 9KN, 1W	William K. Sebastian (D)	Robert Ward; Johnson (D)	2D	Buchanan/ Breckinridge (D) ✓
1859	Elias N. Conway (D)	no such office	Alexander Boileau	J. L. Hollowell	William R. Miller (D)	John Quindley	20D, 2KN, 1OSD, 1SR, 1W	D majority	William K. Sebastian (D)	Robert Ward; Johnson (D)	2D	Buchanan/ Breckinridge (D) ✓
1860	Elias N. Conway (D)	no such office	S. W. Weaver	J. L. Hollowell	H. C. Lowe	Jared C. Martin	20D, 2KN, 1OSD, 1SR, 1W	D majority	William K. Sebastian (D)	Robert Ward; Johnson (D)	2D	Breckinridge/ Lane (SD) ✗
1860	Elias N. Conway (D)	no such office	John I. Stirman	J. L. Hollowell	H. C. Lowe	Jared C. Martin	20D, 2KN, 1OSD, 1SR, 1W	D majority	William K. Sebastian (D)	Robert Ward; Johnson (D)	2D	Breckinridge/ Lane (SD) ✗
1861	Henry Massey; Rector (ID) (Note: The 1861 constitution was enacted during Rector's term; while term lengths remained at four years, a new election schedule was created, calling for elections in 1862, two years into his term.)	no such office	John I. Stirman	P. Jordan	H. C. Lowe	Oliver Basham	D majority	D majority	William K. Sebastian (D)	Charles B. Mitchel (D)	2D	Breckinridge/ Lane (SD) ✗
1861	Henry Massey; Rector (ID)	no such office	John I. Stirman	P. Jordan	William R. Miller (D)	Oliver Basham	D majority	D majority	Civil War and Reconstruction			Breckinridge/ Lane (SD) ✗
1862	Henry Massey; Rector (ID)	no such office	O. H. Oates	Sam W. Williams	William R. Miller (D)	Oliver Basham	D majority	D majority	Civil War and Reconstruction			Breckinridge/ Lane (SD) ✗
1863	Harris Flanagin (I) (Note: Flanagin fled Little Rock as it fell to Union forces on September 10, 1863, leading a largely inept government in exile in Washington, Arkansas, until 1865. Isaac Murphy was elected provisional governor by a loyalist government set up after Union control of the state was established, taking office on April 18, 1864, causing a slight overlap in terms, though due to the collapse of the Confederate effort in Arkansas, Flanagin had no authority over the state.) (Note: The 1864 constitution was enacted during Flanagin's term; however, it was drafted by the Union occupation and had no effect on his government. While term lengths remained at four years, a new election schedule was created, calling for elections in 1864.)	no such office	O. H. Oates	Sam W. Williams	William R. Miller (D)	Oliver Basham	American Civil War		Civil War and Reconstruction			Breckinridge/ Lane (SD) ✗
1864	Harris Flanagin (I)	no such office	Robert J. T. White (I)	C. T. Jordan	William R. Miller (D)	Oliver Basham	American Civil War		Civil War and Reconstruction			Breckinridge/ Lane (SD) ✗
1864	Isaac Murphy (I)	Calvin C. Bliss (I)	Robert J. T. White (I)	C. T. Jordan	J. R. Berry (I)	E. D. Ayers	American Civil War		Civil War and Reconstruction			no electoral votes
1865	Isaac Murphy (I)	Calvin C. Bliss (I)	Robert J. T. White (I)	R. S. Gantt	J. R. Berry (I)	E. D. Ayers	American Civil War		Civil War and Reconstruction			no electoral votes
1866	Isaac Murphy (I)	Calvin C. Bliss (I)	Robert J. T. White (I)	R. H. Deadman	William R. Miller (D)	L. B. Cunningham	25NP	75NP	Civil War and Reconstruction			no electoral votes
1867	Isaac Murphy (I)	Calvin C. Bliss (I)	Robert J. T. White (I)	R. H. Deadman	William R. Miller (D)	Henry Page	25D	56D, 19R	Civil War and Reconstruction			no electoral votes
1868	Isaac Murphy (I)	James M. Johnson (R) (Note: Resigned to take office as state secretary of state.)	Robert J. T. White (I)	J. R. Montgomery	J. R. Berry (R)	Henry Page	25D	56D, 19R	Civil War and Reconstruction			no electoral votes
1868	Powell Clayton (R) (Note: Resigned to take an elected seat in the United States Senate.)	James M. Johnson (R)	Robert J. T. White (I)	J. R. Montgomery	J. R. Berry (R)	Henry Page	25D	56D, 19R	Alexander McDonald (R)	Benjamin F. Rice (R)	3R	Grant/ Colfax (R) ✓
1869	Powell Clayton (R)	James M. Johnson (R)	Robert J. T. White (I)	J. R. Montgomery	J. R. Berry (R)	Henry Page	21R, 1D, 4?	79R, 1D, 2?	Alexander McDonald (R)	Benjamin F. Rice (R)	2R, 1D	Grant/ Colfax (R) ✓
1870	Powell Clayton (R)	James M. Johnson (R)	Robert J. T. White (I)	J. R. Montgomery	J. R. Berry (R)	Henry Page	21R, 1D, 4?	79R, 1D, 2?	Alexander McDonald (R)	Benjamin F. Rice (R)	2R, 1D	Grant/ Colfax (R) ✓
1871	Powell Clayton (R)	James M. Johnson (R)	Robert J. T. White (I)	J. R. Montgomery	J. R. Berry (R)	Henry Page	18R, 8D	44R, 29D, 9LR	Alexander McDonald (R)	Benjamin F. Rice (R)	2R, 1D	Grant/ Colfax (R) ✓
1871	Ozra A. Hadley (R) (Note: As president pro tempore of the state Senate, acted as governor for unexpired term; the office of lieutenant governor at the time was vacant.)	vacant	James M. Johnson (R)	J. R. Montgomery	J. R. Berry (R)	Henry Page	18R, 8D	44R, 29D, 9LR	Powell Clayton (R)	Benjamin F. Rice (R)	2R, 1D	Grant/ Colfax (R) ✓
1872	Ozra A. Hadley (R)	vacant	James M. Johnson (R)	J. R. Montgomery	J. R. Berry (R)	Henry Page	18R, 8D	44R, 29D, 9LR	Powell Clayton (R)	Benjamin F. Rice (R)	2R, 1D	Grant/ Wilson (R) ✓
1873	Elisha Baxter (R) (Note: Removed from office for a short time due to the Brooks–Baxter War.) (Note: The 1874 state constitution, enacted during Baxter's term, shortened his tenure to two years as new elections were scheduled.)	Volney V. Smith (R)	James M. Johnson (R)	Thomas D. W. Yonley (R)	Stephen Wheeler (R)	Henry Page	20R, 5D	52R, 27D, 3?	Powell Clayton (R)	Stephen W. Dorsey (R)	3R	Grant/ Wilson (R) ✓
1874	Elisha Baxter (R)	Volney V. Smith (R)	James M. Johnson (R)	J. L. Witherspoon	Stephen Wheeler (R)	R. E. Newton	20R, 5D	52R, 27D, 3?	Powell Clayton (R)	Stephen W. Dorsey (R)	3R	Grant/ Wilson (R) ✓

== 1874–1926 ==
Year	Executive offices						General Assembly		United States Congress			Electoral votes
Year	Governor	Sec. of State	Attorney General	Auditor	Treasurer	Land Comm.	State Senate	State House	U.S. Senator (Class II)	U.S. Senator (Class III)	U.S. House	Electoral votes
1874	Augustus H. Garland (D)	Benton B. Beavers (D)	Simon P. Hughes Jr. (D)	William R. Miller (D)	Thomas J. Churchill (D)	J. N. Smithee (D)	D majority (Note: More than a dozen Republicans resigned to take jobs in the Baxter administration. Democrats won a majority in the special elections that followed.)	D majority	Powell Clayton (R)	Stephen W. Dorsey (R)	2R, 1D	
1875	Augustus H. Garland (D)	Benton B. Beavers (D)	Simon P. Hughes Jr. (D)	William R. Miller (D)	Thomas J. Churchill (D)	J. N. Smithee (D)	29D, 2R	82D, 11R	Powell Clayton (R)	Stephen W. Dorsey (R)	4D	
1876	Augustus H. Garland (D)	Benton B. Beavers (D)	Simon P. Hughes Jr. (D)	William R. Miller (D)	Thomas J. Churchill (D)	J. N. Smithee (D)	29D, 2R	82D, 11R	Powell Clayton (R)	Stephen W. Dorsey (R)	4D	Tilden/ Hendricks (D) ✗
1877	William R. Miller (D)	Benton B. Beavers (D)	W. F. Henderson	John Crawford (D)	Thomas J. Churchill (D)	J. N. Smithee (D)	29D, 2R	75D, 17R, 1OLW	Augustus H. Garland (D)	Stephen W. Dorsey (R)	4D	Tilden/ Hendricks (D) ✗
1878	William R. Miller (D)	Benton B. Beavers (D)	W. F. Henderson	John Crawford (D)	Thomas J. Churchill (D)	J. N. Smithee (D)	29D, 2R	75D, 17R, 1OLW	Augustus H. Garland (D)	Stephen W. Dorsey (R)	4D	Tilden/ Hendricks (D) ✗
1879	William R. Miller (D)	Jacob Frolich (D)	W. F. Henderson	John Crawford (D)	Thomas J. Churchill (D)	D. W. Lear (D)	29D, 1R, 1GL	83D, 6GL, 3R, 1?	Augustus H. Garland (D)	James D. Walker (D)	4D	Tilden/ Hendricks (D) ✗
1880	William R. Miller (D)	Jacob Frolich (D)	W. F. Henderson	John Crawford (D)	Thomas J. Churchill (D)	D. W. Lear (D)	29D, 1R, 1GL	83D, 6GL, 3R, 1?	Augustus H. Garland (D)	James D. Walker (D)	4D	Hancock/ English (D) ✗
1881	Thomas J. Churchill (D)	Jacob Frolich (D)	Charles B. Moore	John Crawford (D)	W. E. Woodruff Jr.	D. W. Lear (D)	30D, 1GL	80D, 10R, 1GL	Augustus H. Garland (D)	James D. Walker (D)	4D	Hancock/ English (D) ✗
1882	Thomas J. Churchill (D)	Jacob Frolich (D)	Charles B. Moore	John Crawford (D)	W. E. Woodruff Jr.	D. W. Lear (D)	30D, 1GL	80D, 10R, 1GL	Augustus H. Garland (D)	James D. Walker (D)	4D	Hancock/ English (D) ✗
1883	James H. Berry (D)	Jacob Frolich (D)	Charles B. Moore	A. W. Files (D)	W. E. Woodruff Jr.	William P. Campbell (D)	28D, 2GL, 1R	87D, 2GL, 2IR, 1R, 1ID	Augustus H. Garland (D)	James D. Walker (D)	4D	Hancock/ English (D) ✗
1884	James H. Berry (D)	Jacob Frolich (D)	Charles B. Moore	A. W. Files (D)	W. E. Woodruff Jr.	Paul M. Cobbs (D)	28D, 2GL, 1R	87D, 2GL, 2IR, 1R, 1ID	Augustus H. Garland (D)	James D. Walker (D)	4D	Cleveland/ Hendricks (D) ✓
1885	Simon P. Hughes Jr. (D)	Elias B. Moore (D)	D. W. Jones	A. W. Files (D)	W. E. Woodruff Jr.	Paul M. Cobbs (D)	31D, 1R	80D, 15R	James H. Berry (D)	James K. Jones (D)	5D	Cleveland/ Hendricks (D) ✓
1886	Simon P. Hughes Jr. (D)	Elias B. Moore (D)	D. W. Jones	A. W. Files (D)	W. E. Woodruff Jr.	Paul M. Cobbs (D)	31D, 1R	80D, 15R	James H. Berry (D)	James K. Jones (D)	5D	Cleveland/ Hendricks (D) ✓
1887	Simon P. Hughes Jr. (D)	Elias B. Moore (D)	D. W. Jones	William R. Miller (D)	W. E. Woodruff Jr.	Paul M. Cobbs (D)	30D, 2R	73D, 14R, 4I, 3AW, 1G	James H. Berry (D)	James K. Jones (D)	5D	Cleveland/ Hendricks (D) ✓
1887	Simon P. Hughes Jr. (D)	Elias B. Moore (D)	D. W. Jones	W. S. Dunlop (D)	W. E. Woodruff Jr.	Paul M. Cobbs (D)	30D, 2R	73D, 14R, 4I, 3AW, 1G	James H. Berry (D)	James K. Jones (D)	5D	Cleveland/ Hendricks (D) ✓
1888	Simon P. Hughes Jr. (D)	Elias B. Moore (D)	D. W. Jones	W. S. Dunlop (D)	W. E. Woodruff Jr.	Paul M. Cobbs (D)	30D, 2R	73D, 14R, 4I, 3AW, 1G	James H. Berry (D)	James K. Jones (D)	5D	Cleveland/ Thurman (D) ✗
1889	James Philip Eagle (D)	B. B. Chism (D)	W. E. Atkinson	W. S. Dunlop (D)	W. E. Woodruff Jr.	Paul M. Cobbs (D)	30D, 2R	69D, 15UL, 11R	James H. Berry (D)	James K. Jones (D)	5D	Cleveland/ Thurman (D) ✗
1890	James Philip Eagle (D)	B. B. Chism (D)	W. E. Atkinson	W. S. Dunlop (D)	W. E. Woodruff Jr.	C. B. Meyers (D)	30D, 2R	69D, 15UL, 11R	James H. Berry (D)	James K. Jones (D)	4D, 1L	Cleveland/ Thurman (D) ✗
1891	James Philip Eagle (D)	B. B. Chism (D)	W. E. Atkinson	W. S. Dunlop (D)	R. B. Morrow	C. B. Meyers (D)	29D, 2UL, 1R	81D, 10R, 4UL	James H. Berry (D)	James K. Jones (D)	5D	Cleveland/ Thurman (D) ✗
1892	James Philip Eagle (D)	B. B. Chism (D)	W. E. Atkinson	W. S. Dunlop (D)	R. B. Morrow	C. B. Meyers (D)	29D, 2UL, 1R	81D, 10R, 4UL	James H. Berry (D)	James K. Jones (D)	5D	Cleveland/ Stevenson (D) ✓
1893	William M. Fishback (D)	H. B. Armistead (D)	James P. Clarke (D)	C. B. Mills (D)	R. B. Morrow	C. B. Meyers (D)	29D, 2Pop, 1R	85D, 9Pop, 6R	James H. Berry (D)	James K. Jones (D)	6D	Cleveland/ Stevenson (D) ✓
1894	William M. Fishback (D)	H. B. Armistead (D)	James P. Clarke (D)	C. B. Mills (D)	R. B. Morrow	C. B. Meyers (D)	29D, 2Pop, 1R	85D, 9Pop, 6R	James H. Berry (D)	James K. Jones (D)	6D	Cleveland/ Stevenson (D) ✓
1895	James P. Clarke (D)	H. B. Armistead (D)	E. B. Kinsworthy	C. B. Mills (D)	Ransom Gulley	J. F. Ritchie (D)	31D, 1R	88D, 9Pop, 3R	James H. Berry (D)	James K. Jones (D)	6D	Cleveland/ Stevenson (D) ✓
1896	James P. Clarke (D)	H. B. Armistead (D)	E. B. Kinsworthy	C. B. Mills (D)	Ransom Gulley	J. F. Ritchie (D)	31D, 1R	88D, 9Pop, 3R	James H. Berry (D)	James K. Jones (D)	6D	5 – Bryan/ Sewall (D) ✗ 3 – Bryan/ Watson (Pop) ✗
1897	Daniel Webster; Jones (D)	Alexander; C. Hull (D)	E. B. Kinsworthy	Clay Sloan (D)	Ransom Gulley	J. F. Ritchie (D)	30D, 1R, 1Pop	85D, 13Pop, 2R	James H. Berry (D)	James K. Jones (D)	6D	5 – Bryan/ Sewall (D) ✗ 3 – Bryan/ Watson (Pop) ✗
1898	Daniel Webster; Jones (D)	Alexander; C. Hull (D)	E. B. Kinsworthy	Clay Sloan (D)	Ransom Gulley	J. F. Ritchie (D)	30D, 1R, 1Pop	85D, 13Pop, 2R	James H. Berry (D)	James K. Jones (D)	6D	5 – Bryan/ Sewall (D) ✗ 3 – Bryan/ Watson (Pop) ✗
1899	Daniel Webster; Jones (D)	Alexander; C. Hull (D)	Jeff Davis (D)	Clay Sloan (D)	T. E. Little	J. W. Colquitt (D)	32D	98D, 2R	James H. Berry (D)	James K. Jones (D)	6D	5 – Bryan/ Sewall (D) ✗ 3 – Bryan/ Watson (Pop) ✗
1900	Daniel Webster; Jones (D)	Alexander; C. Hull (D)	Jeff Davis (D)	Clay Sloan (D)	T. E. Little	J. W. Colquitt (D)	32D	98D, 2R	James H. Berry (D)	James K. Jones (D)	6D	Bryan/ Stevenson (D) ✗
1901	Jeff Davis (D)	J. W. Crockett (D)	George W. Murphy (D)	T. C. Monroe (D)	H. C. Tipton	J. W. Colquitt (D)	32D	97D, 2R, 1Pop	James H. Berry (D)	James K. Jones (D)	6D	Bryan/ Stevenson (D) ✗
1902	Jeff Davis (D)	J. W. Crockett (D)	George W. Murphy (D)	T. C. Monroe (D)	H. C. Tipton	J. W. Colquitt (D)	32D	97D, 2R, 1Pop	James H. Berry (D)	James K. Jones (D)	6D	Bryan/ Stevenson (D) ✗
1903	Jeff Davis (D)	J. W. Crockett (D)	George W. Murphy (D)	T. C. Monroe (D)	H. C. Tipton	F. E. Conway (D)	35D	100D	James H. Berry (D)	James P. Clarke (D)	7D	Bryan/ Stevenson (D) ✗
1904	Jeff Davis (D)	J. W. Crockett (D)	George W. Murphy (D)	T. C. Monroe (D)	H. C. Tipton	F. E. Conway (D)	35D	100D	James H. Berry (D)	James P. Clarke (D)	7D	Parker/ Davis (D) ✗
1905	Jeff Davis (D)	O. C. Ludwig (D)	Robert L. Rogers	Avery E. Moore (D)	H. C. Tipton	F. E. Conway (D)	34D, 1R	95D, 5R	James H. Berry (D)	James P. Clarke (D)	7D	Parker/ Davis (D) ✗
1906	Jeff Davis (D)	O. C. Ludwig (D)	Robert L. Rogers	Avery E. Moore (D)	H. C. Tipton	F. E. Conway (D)	34D, 1R	95D, 5R	James H. Berry (D)	James P. Clarke (D)	7D	Parker/ Davis (D) ✗
1907	Bass Little (D) (Note: Resigned after suffering a nervous breakdown soon after taking office.)	O. C. Ludwig (D)	William F. Kirby (D)	Avery E. Moore (D)	James L. Yates	Lafayette L. Coffman (D)	34D, 1R	96D, 4R	Jeff Davis (D)	James P. Clarke (D)	7D	Parker/ Davis (D) ✗
1907	John Isaac Moore (D) (Note: As president of the state Senate, acted as governor until the legislature adjourned.)	O. C. Ludwig (D)	William F. Kirby (D)	Avery E. Moore (D)	James L. Yates	Lafayette L. Coffman (D)	34D, 1R	96D, 4R	Jeff Davis (D)	James P. Clarke (D)	7D	Parker/ Davis (D) ✗
1907	X. O. Pindall (D) (Note: As the new president pro tempore of the state Senate, became acting governor until his senate term expired.)	O. C. Ludwig (D)	William F. Kirby (D)	Avery E. Moore (D)	James L. Yates	Lafayette L. Coffman (D)	34D, 1R	96D, 4R	Jeff Davis (D)	James P. Clarke (D)	7D	Parker/ Davis (D) ✗
1908	X. O. Pindall (D)	O. C. Ludwig (D)	William F. Kirby (D)	Avery E. Moore (D)	James L. Yates	Lafayette L. Coffman (D)	34D, 1R	96D, 4R	Jeff Davis (D)	James P. Clarke (D)	7D	Bryan/ Kern (D) ✗
1909	Jesse M. Martin (D) (Note: As the new president pro tempore of the state Senate, became acting governor for three days until the next elected governor took office.)	O. C. Ludwig (D)	Hal L. Norwood	John R. Jobe (D)	James L. Yates	Lafayette L. Coffman (D)	35D	97D, 3R	Jeff Davis (D)	James P. Clarke (D)	7D	Bryan/ Kern (D) ✗
1909	George W. Donaghey (D)	O. C. Ludwig (D)	Hal L. Norwood	John R. Jobe (D)	James L. Yates	Lafayette L. Coffman (D)	35D	97D, 3R	Jeff Davis (D)	James P. Clarke (D)	7D	Bryan/ Kern (D) ✗
1910	George W. Donaghey (D)	O. C. Ludwig (D)	Hal L. Norwood	John R. Jobe (D)	James L. Yates	Lafayette L. Coffman (D)	35D	97D, 3R	Jeff Davis (D)	James P. Clarke (D)	7D	Bryan/ Kern (D) ✗
1911	George W. Donaghey (D)	Earle W. Hodges (D)	Hal L. Norwood	John R. Jobe (D)	John Crockett	Reuben G. Dye (D)	34D, 1R	95D, 5R	Jeff Davis (D)	James P. Clarke (D)	7D	Bryan/ Kern (D) ✗
1912	George W. Donaghey (D)	Earle W. Hodges (D)	Hal L. Norwood	John M. Oathout (D)	John Crockett	Reuben G. Dye (D)	34D, 1R	95D, 5R	Jeff Davis (D)	James P. Clarke (D)	7D	Wilson/ Marshall (D) ✓
1913	Joe T. Robinson (D)	Earle W. Hodges (D)	William L. Moose	L. L. Coffman (D)	John Crockett	Reuben G. Dye (D)	33D, 1R, 1Prog	96D, 4R	John N. Heiskell (D)	James P. Clarke (D)	7D	Wilson/ Marshall (D) ✓
1913	Joe T. Robinson (D)	Earle W. Hodges (D)	William L. Moose	L. L. Coffman (D)	John Crockett	Reuben G. Dye (D)	33D, 1R, 1Prog	96D, 4R	William M. Kavanaugh (D)	James P. Clarke (D)	7D	Wilson/ Marshall (D) ✓
1913	William K. Oldham (D)	Earle W. Hodges (D)	William L. Moose	L. L. Coffman (D)	John Crockett	Reuben G. Dye (D)	33D, 1R, 1Prog	96D, 4R	Joe T. Robinson (D)	James P. Clarke (D)	7D	Wilson/ Marshall (D) ✓
1913	J. Marion Futrell (D)	Earle W. Hodges (D)	William L. Moose	L. L. Coffman (D)	John Crockett	Reuben G. Dye (D)	33D, 1R, 1Prog	96D, 4R	Joe T. Robinson (D)	James P. Clarke (D)	7D	Wilson/ Marshall (D) ✓
1913	George W. Hays (D) (Note: Elected in special election to fill unexpired term.)	Earle W. Hodges (D)	William L. Moose	L. L. Coffman (D)	John Crockett	Reuben G. Dye (D)	33D, 1R, 1Prog	96D, 4R	Joe T. Robinson (D)	James P. Clarke (D)	7D	Wilson/ Marshall (D) ✓
1914	George W. Hays (D)	Earle W. Hodges (D)	William L. Moose	L. L. Coffman (D)	John Crockett	Reuben G. Dye (D)	33D, 1R, 1Prog	96D, 4R	Joe T. Robinson (D)	James P. Clarke (D)	7D	Wilson/ Marshall (D) ✓
1915	George W. Hays (D)	Earle W. Hodges (D)	Wallace Davis	M. F. Dickinson	R. G. McDaniel	William B. Owen (D)	35D	97D, 3R	Joe T. Robinson (D)	James P. Clarke (D)	7D	Wilson/ Marshall (D) ✓
1916	George W. Hays (D)	Earle W. Hodges (D)	Wallace Davis	M. F. Dickinson	R. G. McDaniel	William B. Owen (D)	35D	97D, 3R	Joe T. Robinson (D)	James P. Clarke (D)	7D	Wilson/ Marshall (D) ✓
1917	Charles H. Brough (D)	Tom Terral (D)	John D. Arbuckle	Hogan Oliver (D)	R. G. McDaniel	William B. Owen (D)	34D, 1I	97D, 3R	Joe T. Robinson (D)	William F. Kirby (D)	7D	Wilson/ Marshall (D) ✓
1918	Charles H. Brough (D)	Tom Terral (D)	John D. Arbuckle	Hogan Oliver (D)	R. G. McDaniel	William B. Owen (D)	34D, 1I	97D, 3R	Joe T. Robinson (D)	William F. Kirby (D)	7D	Wilson/ Marshall (D) ✓
1919	Charles H. Brough (D)	Tom Terral (D)	John D. Arbuckle	Hogan Oliver (D)	Joe Ferguson	William B. Owen (D)	35D	95D, 5R	Joe T. Robinson (D)	William F. Kirby (D)	7D	Wilson/ Marshall (D) ✓
1920	Charles H. Brough (D)	Tom Terral (D)	John D. Arbuckle	Hogan Oliver (D)	Joe Ferguson	William B. Owen (D)	35D	95D, 5R	Joe T. Robinson (D)	William F. Kirby (D)	7D	Cox/ Roosevelt (D) ✗
1921	Thomas C. McRae (D)	Ira C. Hopper (D)	J. S. Utley	James Guy Tucker (D)	Joe Ferguson	Herbert R. Wilson (D)	35D	96D, 4R	Joe T. Robinson (D)	Thaddeus H. Caraway (D)	7D	Cox/ Roosevelt (D) ✗
1922	Thomas C. McRae (D)	Ira C. Hopper (D)	J. S. Utley	James Guy Tucker (D)	Joe Ferguson	Herbert R. Wilson (D)	35D	96D, 4R	Joe T. Robinson (D)	Thaddeus H. Caraway (D)	7D	Cox/ Roosevelt (D) ✗
1923	Thomas C. McRae (D)	Ira C. Hopper (D)	J. S. Utley	James Guy Tucker (D)	Joe Ferguson	Herbert R. Wilson (D)	35D	96D, 4R	Joe T. Robinson (D)	Thaddeus H. Caraway (D)	7D	Cox/ Roosevelt (D) ✗
1924	Thomas C. McRae (D)	Ira C. Hopper (D)	J. S. Utley	James Guy Tucker (D)	Joe Ferguson	Herbert R. Wilson (D)	35D	96D, 4R	Joe T. Robinson (D)	Thaddeus H. Caraway (D)	7D	Davis/ Bryan (D) ✗
1925	Tom Terral (D)	Jim B. Higgins (D)	W. H. Applegate	J. Carrol Cone (D)	Sam Sloan	Herbert R. Wilson (D)	35D	97D, 3R	Joe T. Robinson (D)	Thaddeus H. Caraway (D)	7D	Davis/ Bryan (D) ✗
1926	Tom Terral (D)	Jim B. Higgins (D)	W. H. Applegate	J. Carrol Cone (D)	Dwight Blackwood (D)	Herbert R. Wilson (D)	35D	97D, 3R	Joe T. Robinson (D)	Thaddeus H. Caraway (D)	7D	Davis/ Bryan (D) ✗

== 1927–present ==
Year	Executive offices							General Assembly		United States Congress			Electoral votes
Year	Governor	Lieutenant Governor	Sec. of State	Attorney General	Auditor	Treasurer	Land Comm.	State Senate	State House	U.S. Senator (Class II)	U.S. Senator (Class III)	U.S. House	Electoral votes
1927	John E. Martineau (D) (Note: Resigned to become a judge on the United States District Court for the Eastern District of Arkansas.)	Harvey Parnell (D)	Jim B. Higgins (D)	W. H. Applegate	J. Carrol Cone (D)	Ralph Koonce	Dwight Blackwood (D)	35D	96D, 4R	Joe T. Robinson (D)	Thaddeus Caraway (D)	7D	
1928	John E. Martineau (D)	Harvey Parnell (D)	Jim B. Higgins (D)	W. H. Applegate	J. Carrol Cone (D)	Ralph Koonce	Dwight Blackwood (D)	35D	96D, 4R	Joe T. Robinson (D)	Thaddeus Caraway (D)	7D	Smith/ Robinson (D) ✗
1928	Harvey Parnell (D) (Note: As lieutenant governor, acted as governor for unexpired term and was subsequently elected in his own right.)	Lee Cazort (D)	Jim B. Higgins (D)	W. H. Applegate	J. Carrol Cone (D)	Ralph Koonce	Dwight Blackwood (D)	35D	96D, 4R	Joe T. Robinson (D)	Thaddeus Caraway (D)	7D	Smith/ Robinson (D) ✗
1929	Harvey Parnell (D)	Lee Cazort (D)	Jim B. Higgins (D)	Hal L. Norwood	J. Oscar Humphrey (D)	Ralph Koonce	Belva Martin (D)	35D	98D, 2R	Joe T. Robinson (D)	Thaddeus Caraway (D)	7D	Smith/ Robinson (D) ✗
1930	Harvey Parnell (D)	Lee Cazort (D)	Jim B. Higgins (D)	Hal L. Norwood	J. Oscar Humphrey (D)	Ralph Koonce	Belva Martin (D)	35D	98D, 2R	Joe T. Robinson (D)	Thaddeus Caraway (D)	7D	Smith/ Robinson (D) ✗
1931	Harvey Parnell (D)	Lawrence E. Wilson (D)	Ed F. McDonald (D)	Hal L. Norwood	J. Oscar Humphrey (D)	Roy V. Leonard	Belva Martin (D)	35D	99D, 1R	Joe T. Robinson (D)	Thaddeus Caraway (D)	7D	Smith/ Robinson (D) ✗
1932	Harvey Parnell (D)	Lawrence E. Wilson (D)	Ed F. McDonald (D)	Hal L. Norwood	J. Oscar Humphrey (D)	Roy V. Leonard	Belva Martin (D)	35D	99D, 1R	Joe T. Robinson (D)	Hattie Caraway (D)	7D	Roosevelt/ Garner (D) ✓
1933	J. Marion Futrell (D)	Lee Cazort (D)	Ed F. McDonald (D)	Hal L. Norwood	J. Oscar Humphrey (D)	Roy V. Leonard	George W. Neal (D)	35D	100D	Joe T. Robinson (D)	Hattie Caraway (D)	7D	Roosevelt/ Garner (D) ✓
1934	J. Marion Futrell (D)	Lee Cazort (D)	Ed F. McDonald (D)	Walter L. Pope	J. Oscar Humphrey (D)	Roy V. Leonard	George W. Neal (D)	35D	100D	Joe T. Robinson (D)	Hattie Caraway (D)	7D	Roosevelt/ Garner (D) ✓
1935	J. Marion Futrell (D)	Lee Cazort (D)	Ed F. McDonald (D)	Carl E. Bailey (D)	Charles E. Parker (D)	Earl Page (D)	George W. Neal (D)	35D	100D	Joe T. Robinson (D)	Hattie Caraway (D)	7D	Roosevelt/ Garner (D) ✓
1936	J. Marion Futrell (D)	Lee Cazort (D)	Ed F. McDonald (D)	Carl E. Bailey (D)	Charles E. Parker (D)	Earl Page (D)	George W. Neal (D)	35D	100D	Joe T. Robinson (D)	Hattie Caraway (D)	7D	Roosevelt/ Garner (D) ✓
1937	Carl E. Bailey (D)	Robert L. Bailey (D)	Crip Hall (D)	Jack Holt (D)	J. Oscar Humphrey (D)	Earl Page (D)	Otis Page (D)	35D	98D, 2R	Joe T. Robinson (D)	Hattie Caraway (D)	7D	Roosevelt/ Garner (D) ✓
1937	Carl E. Bailey (D)	Robert L. Bailey (D)	Crip Hall (D)	Jack Holt (D)	J. Oscar Humphrey (D)	Earl Page (D)	Otis Page (D)	35D	98D, 2R	vacant	Hattie Caraway (D)	7D	Roosevelt/ Garner (D) ✓
1938	Carl E. Bailey (D)	Robert L. Bailey (D)	Crip Hall (D)	Jack Holt (D)	J. Oscar Humphrey (D)	Earl Page (D)	Otis Page (D)	35D	98D, 2R	John E. Miller (D)	Hattie Caraway (D)	7D	Roosevelt/ Garner (D) ✓
1939	Carl E. Bailey (D)	Robert L. Bailey (D)	Crip Hall (D)	Jack Holt (D)	J. Oscar Humphrey (D)	Earl Page (D)	Otis Page (D)	35D	98D, 2R	John E. Miller (D)	Hattie Caraway (D)	7D	Roosevelt/ Garner (D) ✓
1940	Carl E. Bailey (D)	Robert L. Bailey (D)	Crip Hall (D)	Jack Holt (D)	J. Oscar Humphrey (D)	Earl Page (D)	Otis Page (D)	35D	98D, 2R	John E. Miller (D)	Hattie Caraway (D)	7D	Roosevelt/ Wallace (D) ✓
1941	Homer M. Adkins (D)	Robert L. Bailey (D)	Crip Hall (D)	Jack Holt (D)	J. Oscar Humphrey (D)	Earl Page (D)	Otis Page (D)	35D	98D, 2R	Lloyd Spencer (D)	Hattie Caraway (D)	7D	Roosevelt/ Wallace (D) ✓
1942	Homer M. Adkins (D)	Robert L. Bailey (D)	Crip Hall (D)	Jack Holt (D)	J. Oscar Humphrey (D)	Earl Page (D)	Otis Page (D)	35D	98D, 2R	Lloyd Spencer (D)	Hattie Caraway (D)	7D	Roosevelt/ Wallace (D) ✓
1943	Homer M. Adkins (D)	James L. Shaver (D)	Crip Hall (D)	Guy E. Williams (D)	J. Oscar Humphrey (D)	Earl Page (D)	Bish Bentley (D)	35D	98D, 2R	John L. McClellan (D)	Hattie Caraway (D)	7D	Roosevelt/ Wallace (D) ✓
1944	Homer M. Adkins (D)	James L. Shaver (D)	Crip Hall (D)	Guy E. Williams (D)	J. Oscar Humphrey (D)	Earl Page (D)	Claude Rankin (D)	35D	98D, 2R	John L. McClellan (D)	Hattie Caraway (D)	7D	Roosevelt/ Truman (D) ✓
1945	Ben Laney (D)	James L. Shaver (D)	Crip Hall (D)	Guy E. Williams (D)	J. Oscar Humphrey (D)	Vance Clayton (D)	Claude Rankin (D)	35D	98D, 2R	John L. McClellan (D)	J. William Fulbright (D)	7D	Roosevelt/ Truman (D) ✓
1946	Ben Laney (D)	James L. Shaver (D)	Crip Hall (D)	Guy E. Williams (D)	J. Oscar Humphrey (D)	Vance Clayton (D)	Claude Rankin (D)	35D	98D, 2R	John L. McClellan (D)	J. William Fulbright (D)	7D	Roosevelt/ Truman (D) ✓
1947	Ben Laney (D)	Nathan G. Gordon (D)	Crip Hall (D)	Guy E. Williams (D)	J. Oscar Humphrey (D)	Vance Clayton (D)	Claude Rankin (D)	35D	96D, 3R, 1I	John L. McClellan (D)	J. William Fulbright (D)	7D	Roosevelt/ Truman (D) ✓
1948	Ben Laney (D)	Nathan G. Gordon (D)	Crip Hall (D)	Guy E. Williams (D)	J. Oscar Humphrey (D)	Vance Clayton (D)	Claude Rankin (D)	35D	96D, 3R, 1I	John L. McClellan (D)	J. William Fulbright (D)	7D	Truman/ Barkley (D) ✓
1949	Sid McMath (D)	Nathan G. Gordon (D)	Crip Hall (D)	Ike Murray (D)	J. Oscar Humphrey (D)	Vance Clayton (D)	Claude Rankin (D)	35D	98D, 2R	John L. McClellan (D)	J. William Fulbright (D)	7D	Truman/ Barkley (D) ✓
1950	Sid McMath (D)	Nathan G. Gordon (D)	Crip Hall (D)	Ike Murray (D)	J. Oscar Humphrey (D)	Vance Clayton (D)	Claude Rankin (D)	35D	98D, 2R	John L. McClellan (D)	J. William Fulbright (D)	7D	Truman/ Barkley (D) ✓
1951	Sid McMath (D)	Nathan G. Gordon (D)	Crip Hall (D)	Ike Murray (D)	J. Oscar Humphrey (D)	Vance Clayton (D)	Claude Rankin (D)	35D	98D, 2R	John L. McClellan (D)	J. William Fulbright (D)	7D	Truman/ Barkley (D) ✓
1952	Sid McMath (D)	Nathan G. Gordon (D)	Crip Hall (D)	Ike Murray (D)	J. Oscar Humphrey (D)	Vance Clayton (D)	Claude Rankin (D)	35D	98D, 2R	John L. McClellan (D)	J. William Fulbright (D)	7D	Stevenson/ Sparkman (D) ✗
1953	Francis Cherry (D)	Nathan G. Gordon (D)	Crip Hall (D)	Tom Gentry (D)	J. Oscar Humphrey (D)	Vance Clayton (D)	Claude Rankin (D)	35D	97D, 3R	John L. McClellan (D)	J. William Fulbright (D)	6D	Stevenson/ Sparkman (D) ✗
1954	Francis Cherry (D)	Nathan G. Gordon (D)	Crip Hall (D)	Tom Gentry (D)	J. Oscar Humphrey (D)	Vance Clayton (D)	Claude Rankin (D)	35D	97D, 3R	John L. McClellan (D)	J. William Fulbright (D)	6D	Stevenson/ Sparkman (D) ✗
1955	Orval Faubus (D)	Nathan G. Gordon (D)	Crip Hall (D)	Tom Gentry (D)	J. Oscar Humphrey (D)	Vance Clayton (D)	James H. Jones (D)	35D	97D, 3R	John L. McClellan (D)	J. William Fulbright (D)	6D	Stevenson/ Sparkman (D) ✗
1956	Orval Faubus (D)	Nathan G. Gordon (D)	Crip Hall (D)	Tom Gentry (D)	F. Nolan Humphrey (D)	Vance Clayton (D)	James H. Jones (D)	35D	97D, 3R	John L. McClellan (D)	J. William Fulbright (D)	6D	Stevenson/ Kefauver (D) ✗
1957	Orval Faubus (D)	Nathan G. Gordon (D)	Crip Hall (D)	Bruce Bennett (D)	James H. Jones (D) (Note: Appointed by governor to fill vacancy.)	Vance Clayton (D)	Sam Jones (D)	35D	98D, 2R	John L. McClellan (D)	J. William Fulbright (D)	6D	Stevenson/ Kefauver (D) ✗
1958	Orval Faubus (D)	Nathan G. Gordon (D)	Crip Hall (D)	Bruce Bennett (D)	James H. Jones (D)	Vance Clayton (D)	Sam Jones (D)	35D	98D, 2R	John L. McClellan (D)	J. William Fulbright (D)	6D	Stevenson/ Kefauver (D) ✗
1959	Orval Faubus (D)	Nathan G. Gordon (D)	Crip Hall (D)	Bruce Bennett (D)	James H. Jones (D)	Vance Clayton (D)	Sam Jones (D)	35D	100D	John L. McClellan (D)	J. William Fulbright (D)	6D	Stevenson/ Kefauver (D) ✗
1960	Orval Faubus (D)	Nathan G. Gordon (D)	Crip Hall (D)	Bruce Bennett (D)	James H. Jones (D)	Vance Clayton (D)	Sam Jones (D)	35D	100D	John L. McClellan (D)	J. William Fulbright (D)	6D	Kennedy/ Johnson (D) ✓
1961	Orval Faubus (D)	Nathan G. Gordon (D)	Nancy Hall (D)	J. Frank Holt (D)	James H. Jones (D)	Lee A. Clayton (D)	Sam Jones (D)	35D	99D, 1R	John L. McClellan (D)	J. William Fulbright (D)	6D	Kennedy/ Johnson (D) ✓
1962	Orval Faubus (D)	Nathan G. Gordon (D)	Nancy Hall (D)	Jack Holt Jr. (D)	James H. Jones (D)	Lee A. Clayton (D)	Sam Jones (D)	35D	99D, 1R	John L. McClellan (D)	J. William Fulbright (D)	6D	Kennedy/ Johnson (D) ✓
1963	Orval Faubus (D)	Nathan G. Gordon (D)	Kelly Bryant (D)	Bruce Bennett (D)	James H. Jones (D)	Nancy Hall (D)	Sam Jones (D)	35D	99D, 1I	John L. McClellan (D)	J. William Fulbright (D)	4D	Kennedy/ Johnson (D) ✓
1964	Orval Faubus (D)	Nathan G. Gordon (D)	Kelly Bryant (D)	Bruce Bennett (D)	James H. Jones (D)	Nancy Hall (D)	Sam Jones (D)	35D	99D, 1I	John L. McClellan (D)	J. William Fulbright (D)	4D	Johnson/ Humphrey (D) ✓
1965	Orval Faubus (D)	Nathan G. Gordon (D)	Kelly Bryant (D)	Bruce Bennett (D)	James H. Jones (D)	Nancy Hall (D)	Sam Jones (D)	35D	99D, 1R	John L. McClellan (D)	J. William Fulbright (D)	4D	Johnson/ Humphrey (D) ✓
1966	Orval Faubus (D)	Nathan G. Gordon (D)	Kelly Bryant (D)	Bruce Bennett (D)	James H. Jones (D)	Nancy Hall (D)	Sam Jones (D)	35D	99D, 1R	John L. McClellan (D)	J. William Fulbright (D)	4D	Johnson/ Humphrey (D) ✓
1967	Winthrop Rockefeller (R)	Maurice Britt (R)	Kelly Bryant (D)	Joe Purcell (D)	James H. Jones (D)	Nancy Hall (D)	Sam Jones (D)	35D	97D, 3R	John L. McClellan (D)	J. William Fulbright (D)	3D, 1R	Johnson/ Humphrey (D) ✓
1968	Winthrop Rockefeller (R)	Maurice Britt (R)	Kelly Bryant (D)	Joe Purcell (D)	James H. Jones (D)	Nancy Hall (D)	Sam Jones (D)	35D	97D, 3R	John L. McClellan (D)	J. William Fulbright (D)	3D, 1R	Wallace/ LeMay (AI) ✗
1969	Winthrop Rockefeller (R)	Maurice Britt (R)	Kelly Bryant (D)	Joe Purcell (D)	James H. Jones (D)	Nancy Hall (D)	Sam Jones (D)	34D, 1R	96D, 4R	John L. McClellan (D)	J. William Fulbright (D)	3D, 1R	Wallace/ LeMay (AI) ✗
1970	Winthrop Rockefeller (R)	Maurice Britt (R)	Kelly Bryant (D)	Joe Purcell (D)	James H. Jones (D)	Nancy Hall (D)	Sam Jones (D)	34D, 1R	96D, 4R	John L. McClellan (D)	J. William Fulbright (D)	3D, 1R	Wallace/ LeMay (AI) ✗
1971	Dale Bumpers (D)	Bob C. Riley (D)	Kelly Bryant (D)	Ray Thornton (D)	James H. Jones (D)	Nancy Hall (D)	Sam Jones (D)	34D, 1R	98D, 2R	John L. McClellan (D)	J. William Fulbright (D)	3D, 1R	Wallace/ LeMay (AI) ✗
1972	Dale Bumpers (D)	Bob C. Riley (D)	Kelly Bryant (D)	Ray Thornton (D)	James H. Jones (D)	Nancy Hall (D)	Sam Jones (D)	34D, 1R	98D, 2R	John L. McClellan (D)	J. William Fulbright (D)	3D, 1R	Nixon/ Agnew (R) ✓
1973	Dale Bumpers (D)	Bob C. Riley (D)	Kelly Bryant (D)	Jim Guy Tucker (D)	James H. Jones (D)	Nancy Hall (D)	Sam Jones (D)	34D, 1R	99D, 1R	John L. McClellan (D)	J. William Fulbright (D)	3D, 1R	Nixon/ Agnew (R) ✓
1974	Dale Bumpers (D)	Bob C. Riley (D)	Kelly Bryant (D)	Jim Guy Tucker (D)	James H. Jones (D)	Nancy Hall (D)	Sam Jones (D)	34D, 1R	99D, 1R	John L. McClellan (D)	J. William Fulbright (D)	3D, 1R	Nixon/ Agnew (R) ✓
1975	Bob C. Riley (D) (Note: As lieutenant governor, acted as governor for unexpired term.)	vacant	Kelly Bryant (D)	Jim Guy Tucker (D)	James H. Jones (D)	Nancy Hall (D)	Sam Jones (D)	34D, 1R	97D, 3R	John L. McClellan (D)	Dale Bumpers (D)	3D, 1R	Nixon/ Agnew (R) ✓
1975	David Pryor (D)	Joe Purcell (D)	George Jernigan (D)	Jim Guy Tucker (D)	James H. Jones (D)	Nancy Hall (D)	Sam Jones (D)	34D, 1R	97D, 3R	John L. McClellan (D)	Dale Bumpers (D)	3D, 1R	Nixon/ Agnew (R) ✓
1976	David Pryor (D)	Joe Purcell (D)	George Jernigan (D)	Jim Guy Tucker (D)	James H. Jones (D)	Nancy Hall (D)	Sam Jones (D)	34D, 1R	97D, 3R	John L. McClellan (D)	Dale Bumpers (D)	3D, 1R	Carter/ Mondale (D) ✓
1977	David Pryor (D)	Joe Purcell (D)	Winston Bryant (D)	Bill Clinton (D) (Note: Resigned after being elected governor in 1978.)	James H. Jones (D)	Nancy Hall (D)	Sam Jones (D)	34D, 1R	96D, 4R	John L. McClellan (D)	Dale Bumpers (D)	3D, 1R	Carter/ Mondale (D) ✓
1978	David Pryor (D)	Joe Purcell (D)	Winston Bryant (D)	Bill Clinton (D)	James H. Jones (D)	Nancy Hall (D)	Sam Jones (D)	34D, 1R	96D, 4R	Kaneaster Hodges (D)	Dale Bumpers (D)	3D, 1R	Carter/ Mondale (D) ✓
1979	Joe Purcell (D)	vacant	Paul Riviere (D)	Steve Clark (D)	James H. Jones (D)	Nancy Hall (D)	Sam Jones (D)	35D	94D, 6R	David Pryor (D)	Dale Bumpers (D)	2D, 2R	Carter/ Mondale (D) ✓
1979	Bill Clinton (D)	Joe Purcell (D)	Paul Riviere (D)	Steve Clark (D)	Jimmie Lou Fisher (D)	Nancy Hall (D)	Sam Jones (D)	35D	94D, 6R	David Pryor (D)	Dale Bumpers (D)	2D, 2R	Carter/ Mondale (D) ✓
1980	Bill Clinton (D)	Joe Purcell (D)	Paul Riviere (D)	Steve Clark (D)	Jimmie Lou Fisher (D)	Nancy Hall (D)	Sam Jones (D)	35D	94D, 6R	David Pryor (D)	Dale Bumpers (D)	2D, 2R	Reagan/ Bush (R) ✓
1981	Frank D. White (R)	Winston Bryant (D)	Paul Riviere (D)	Steve Clark (D)	Julia Hughes Jones (D)	Jimmie Lou Fisher (D)	Bill McCuen (D)	34D, 1R	93D, 7R	David Pryor (D)	Dale Bumpers (D)	2D, 2R	Reagan/ Bush (R) ✓
1982	Frank D. White (R)	Winston Bryant (D)	Paul Riviere (D)	Steve Clark (D)	Julia Hughes Jones (D)	Jimmie Lou Fisher (D)	Bill McCuen (D)	34D, 1R	93D, 7R	David Pryor (D)	Dale Bumpers (D)	2D, 2R	Reagan/ Bush (R) ✓
1983	Bill Clinton (D) (Note: Gubernatorial terms changed from two years to four years during Clinton's term; he was elected for two-year terms in 1982 and 1984, and for four-year terms in 1986 and 1990.) (Note: Resigned to become president of the United States.)	Winston Bryant (D)	Paul Riviere (D)	Steve Clark (D)	Julia Hughes Jones (D)	Jimmie Lou Fisher (D)	Bill McCuen (D)	32D, 3R	93D, 7R	David Pryor (D)	Dale Bumpers (D)	2D, 2R	Reagan/ Bush (R) ✓
1984	Bill Clinton (D)	Winston Bryant (D)	Paul Riviere (D)	Steve Clark (D)	Julia Hughes Jones (D)	Jimmie Lou Fisher (D)	Bill McCuen (D)	32D, 3R	93D, 7R	David Pryor (D)	Dale Bumpers (D)	2D, 2R	Reagan/ Bush (R) ✓
1985	Bill Clinton (D)	Winston Bryant (D)	Bill McCuen (D)	Steve Clark (D)	Julia Hughes Jones (D)	Jimmie Lou Fisher (D)	Charlie Daniels (D)	32D, 3R	91D, 9R	David Pryor (D)	Dale Bumpers (D)	3D, 1R	Reagan/ Bush (R) ✓
1986	Bill Clinton (D)	Winston Bryant (D)	Bill McCuen (D)	Steve Clark (D)	Julia Hughes Jones (D)	Jimmie Lou Fisher (D)	Charlie Daniels (D)	32D, 3R	91D, 9R	David Pryor (D)	Dale Bumpers (D)	3D, 1R	Reagan/ Bush (R) ✓
1987	Bill Clinton (D)	Winston Bryant (D)	Bill McCuen (D)	Steve Clark (D)	Julia Hughes Jones (D)	Jimmie Lou Fisher (D)	Charlie Daniels (D)	31D, 4R	91D, 9R	David Pryor (D)	Dale Bumpers (D)	3D, 1R	Reagan/ Bush (R) ✓
1988	Bill Clinton (D)	Winston Bryant (D)	Bill McCuen (D)	Steve Clark (D)	Julia Hughes Jones (D)	Jimmie Lou Fisher (D)	Charlie Daniels (D)	31D, 4R	91D, 9R	David Pryor (D)	Dale Bumpers (D)	3D, 1R	Bush/ Quayle (R) ✓
1989	Bill Clinton (D)	Winston Bryant (D)	Bill McCuen (D)	Steve Clark (D)	Julia Hughes Jones (D)	Jimmie Lou Fisher (D)	Charlie Daniels (D)	31D, 4R	88D, 12R	David Pryor (D)	Dale Bumpers (D)	3D, 1R	Bush/ Quayle (R) ✓
1989	Bill Clinton (D)	Winston Bryant (D)	Bill McCuen (D)	Steve Clark (D)	Julia Hughes Jones (D)	Jimmie Lou Fisher (D)	Charlie Daniels (D)	31D, 4R	88D, 12R	David Pryor (D)	Dale Bumpers (D)	2D, 2R	Bush/ Quayle (R) ✓
1990	Bill Clinton (D)	Winston Bryant (D)	Bill McCuen (D)	Steve Clark (D)	Julia Hughes Jones (D)	Jimmie Lou Fisher (D)	Charlie Daniels (D)	31D, 4R	88D, 12R	David Pryor (D)	Dale Bumpers (D)	2D, 2R	Bush/ Quayle (R) ✓
1990	Bill Clinton (D)	Winston Bryant (D)	Bill McCuen (D)	Ron Fields (D)	Julia Hughes Jones (D)	Jimmie Lou Fisher (D)	Charlie Daniels (D)	31D, 4R	88D, 12R	David Pryor (D)	Dale Bumpers (D)	2D, 2R	Bush/ Quayle (R) ✓
1991	Bill Clinton (D)	Jim Guy Tucker (D)	Bill McCuen (D)	Mary Stallcup (D)	Julia Hughes Jones (D)	Jimmie Lou Fisher (D)	Charlie Daniels (D)	31D, 4R	91D, 9R	David Pryor (D)	Dale Bumpers (D)	3D, 1R	Bush/ Quayle (R) ✓
1991	Bill Clinton (D)	Jim Guy Tucker (D)	Bill McCuen (D)	Winston Bryant (D)	Julia Hughes Jones (D)	Jimmie Lou Fisher (D)	Charlie Daniels (D)	31D, 4R	91D, 9R	David Pryor (D)	Dale Bumpers (D)	3D, 1R	Bush/ Quayle (R) ✓
1992	Jim Guy Tucker (D) (Note: Resigned after being convicted of mail fraud in the Whitewater scandal.)	Mike Huckabee (R)	Bill McCuen (D)	Winston Bryant (D)	Julia Hughes Jones (D)	Jimmie Lou Fisher (D)	Charlie Daniels (D)	31D, 4R	91D, 9R	David Pryor (D)	Dale Bumpers (D)	3D, 1R	Clinton/ Gore (D) ✓
1993	Jim Guy Tucker (D)	Mike Huckabee (R)	Bill McCuen (D)	Winston Bryant (D)	Gus Wingfield (D)	Jimmie Lou Fisher (D)	Charlie Daniels (D)	31D, 4R	89D, 11R	David Pryor (D)	Dale Bumpers (D)	2D, 2R	Clinton/ Gore (D) ✓
1994	Jim Guy Tucker (D)	Mike Huckabee (R)	Bill McCuen (D)	Winston Bryant (D)	Gus Wingfield (D)	Jimmie Lou Fisher (D)	Charlie Daniels (D)	31D, 4R	89D, 11R	David Pryor (D)	Dale Bumpers (D)	2D, 2R	Clinton/ Gore (D) ✓
1995	Jim Guy Tucker (D)	Mike Huckabee (R)	Sharon Priest (D)	Winston Bryant (D)	Gus Wingfield (D)	Jimmie Lou Fisher (D)	Charlie Daniels (D)	30D, 5R	88D, 12R	David Pryor (D)	Dale Bumpers (D)	2D, 2R	Clinton/ Gore (D) ✓
1996	Jim Guy Tucker (D)	Mike Huckabee (R)	Sharon Priest (D)	Winston Bryant (D)	Gus Wingfield (D)	Jimmie Lou Fisher (D)	Charlie Daniels (D)	30D, 5R	88D, 12R	David Pryor (D)	Dale Bumpers (D)	2D, 2R	Clinton/ Gore (D) ✓
1996	Mike Huckabee (R)	Win; Rockefeller (R) (Note: First elected in special election following Huckabee's elevation to governorship.)	Sharon Priest (D)	Winston Bryant (D)	Gus Wingfield (D)	Jimmie Lou Fisher (D)	Charlie Daniels (D)	30D, 5R	88D, 12R	David Pryor (D)	Dale Bumpers (D)	2D, 2R	Clinton/ Gore (D) ✓
1997	Mike Huckabee (R)	Win; Rockefeller (R)	Sharon Priest (D)	Winston Bryant (D)	Gus Wingfield (D)	Jimmie Lou Fisher (D)	Charlie Daniels (D)	30D, 5R	87D, 13R	Tim Hutchinson (R)	Dale Bumpers (D)	2D, 2R	Clinton/ Gore (D) ✓
1998	Mike Huckabee (R)	Win; Rockefeller (R)	Sharon Priest (D)	Winston Bryant (D)	Gus Wingfield (D)	Jimmie Lou Fisher (D)	Charlie Daniels (D)	30D, 5R	87D, 13R	Tim Hutchinson (R)	Dale Bumpers (D)	2D, 2R	Clinton/ Gore (D) ✓
1999	Mike Huckabee (R)	Win; Rockefeller (R)	Sharon Priest (D)	Mark Pryor (D)	Gus Wingfield (D)	Jimmie Lou Fisher (D)	Charlie Daniels (D)	30D, 5R	76D, 24R	Tim Hutchinson (R)	Blanche Lincoln (D)	2D, 2R	Clinton/ Gore (D) ✓
2000	Mike Huckabee (R)	Win; Rockefeller (R)	Sharon Priest (D)	Mark Pryor (D)	Gus Wingfield (D)	Jimmie Lou Fisher (D)	Charlie Daniels (D)	30D, 5R	76D, 24R	Tim Hutchinson (R)	Blanche Lincoln (D)	2D, 2R	Bush/ Cheney (R) ✓
2001	Mike Huckabee (R)	Win; Rockefeller (R)	Sharon Priest (D)	Mark Pryor (D)	Gus Wingfield (D)	Jimmie Lou Fisher (D)	Charlie Daniels (D)	27D, 8R	72D, 28R	Tim Hutchinson (R)	Blanche Lincoln (D)	3D, 1R	Bush/ Cheney (R) ✓
2002	Mike Huckabee (R)	Win; Rockefeller (R)	Sharon Priest (D)	Mark Pryor (D)	Gus Wingfield (D)	Jimmie Lou Fisher (D)	Charlie Daniels (D)	27D, 8R	72D, 28R	Tim Hutchinson (R)	Blanche Lincoln (D)	3D, 1R	Bush/ Cheney (R) ✓
2003	Mike Huckabee (R)	Win; Rockefeller (R)	Charlie Daniels (D)	Mike Beebe (D)	Jim Wood (D)	Gus Wingfield (D)	Mark Wilcox (D)	27D, 8R	70D, 30R	Mark Pryor (D)	Blanche Lincoln (D)	3D, 1R	Bush/ Cheney (R) ✓
2004	Mike Huckabee (R)	Win; Rockefeller (R)	Charlie Daniels (D)	Mike Beebe (D)	Jim Wood (D)	Gus Wingfield (D)	Mark Wilcox (D)	27D, 8R	70D, 30R	Mark Pryor (D)	Blanche Lincoln (D)	3D, 1R	Bush/ Cheney (R) ✓
2005	Mike Huckabee (R)	Win; Rockefeller (R)	Charlie Daniels (D)	Mike Beebe (D)	Jim Wood (D)	Gus Wingfield (D)	Mark Wilcox (D)	27D, 8R	72D, 28R	Mark Pryor (D)	Blanche Lincoln (D)	3D, 1R	Bush/ Cheney (R) ✓
2006	Mike Huckabee (R)	Win; Rockefeller (R)	Charlie Daniels (D)	Mike Beebe (D)	Jim Wood (D)	Gus Wingfield (D)	Mark Wilcox (D)	27D, 8R	72D, 28R	Mark Pryor (D)	Blanche Lincoln (D)	3D, 1R	Bush/ Cheney (R) ✓
2007	Mike Beebe (D)	Bill Halter (D)	Charlie Daniels (D)	Dustin McDaniel (D)	Jim Wood (D)	Martha Shoffner (D)	Mark Wilcox (D)	27D, 8R	72D, 28R	Mark Pryor (D)	Blanche Lincoln (D)	3D, 1R	Bush/ Cheney (R) ✓
2008	Mike Beebe (D)	Bill Halter (D)	Charlie Daniels (D)	Dustin McDaniel (D)	Jim Wood (D)	Martha Shoffner (D)	Mark Wilcox (D)	27D, 8R	72D, 28R	Mark Pryor (D)	Blanche Lincoln (D)	3D, 1R	McCain/ Palin (R) ✗
2009	Mike Beebe (D)	Bill Halter (D)	Charlie Daniels (D)	Dustin McDaniel (D)	Jim Wood (D)	Martha Shoffner (D)	Mark Wilcox (D)	27D, 8R	71D, 28R, 1G	Mark Pryor (D)	Blanche Lincoln (D)	3D, 1R	McCain/ Palin (R) ✗
2010	Mike Beebe (D)	Bill Halter (D)	Charlie Daniels (D)	Dustin McDaniel (D)	Jim Wood (D)	Martha Shoffner (D)	Mark Wilcox (D)	27D, 8R	72D, 28R (Note: Richard Carroll switched parties from Green to Democratic.)	Mark Pryor (D)	Blanche Lincoln (D)	3D, 1R	McCain/ Palin (R) ✗
2011	Mike Beebe (D)	Mark Darr (R) (Note: Resigned February 1, 2014 after being fined for ethics violations.)	Mark Martin (R)	Dustin McDaniel (D)	Charlie Daniels (D)	Martha Shoffner (D)	John Thurston (R)	20D, 15R	55D, 45R	Mark Pryor (D)	John Boozman (R)	3R, 1D	McCain/ Palin (R) ✗
2012	Mike Beebe (D)	Mark Darr (R)	Mark Martin (R)	Dustin McDaniel (D)	Charlie Daniels (D)	Martha Shoffner (D)	John Thurston (R)	20D, 15R	54D, 46R (Note: Linda Collins switched parties from Democratic to Republican.)	Mark Pryor (D)	John Boozman (R)	3R, 1D	Romney/ Ryan (R) ✗
2013	Mike Beebe (D)	Mark Darr (R)	Mark Martin (R)	Dustin McDaniel (D)	Charlie Daniels (D)	Martha Shoffner (D)	John Thurston (R)	21R, 14D	51R, 48D, 1G	Mark Pryor (D)	John Boozman (R)	4R	Romney/ Ryan (R) ✗
2013	Mike Beebe (D)	Mark Darr (R)	Mark Martin (R)	Dustin McDaniel (D)	Charlie Daniels (D)	Charles Robinson (D)	John Thurston (R)	21R, 14D	51R, 48D, 1G	Mark Pryor (D)	John Boozman (R)	4R	Romney/ Ryan (R) ✗
2014	Mike Beebe (D)	vacant	Mark Martin (R)	Dustin McDaniel (D)	Charlie Daniels (D)	Charles Robinson (D)	John Thurston (R)	22R, 13D	51R, 48D, 1G	Mark Pryor (D)	John Boozman (R)	4R	Romney/ Ryan (R) ✗
2015	Asa Hutchinson (R)	Tim Griffin (R)	Mark Martin (R)	Leslie Rutledge (R)	Andrea Lea (R)	Dennis Milligan (R)	John Thurston (R)	24R, 11D	64R, 36D	Tom Cotton (R)	John Boozman (R)	4R	Romney/ Ryan (R) ✗
2016	Asa Hutchinson (R)	Tim Griffin (R)	Mark Martin (R)	Leslie Rutledge (R)	Andrea Lea (R)	Dennis Milligan (R)	John Thurston (R)	24R, 11D	64R, 35D, 1I (Note: Rep. Nate Bell left the Republican Party to sit as an independent in June 2015. Mike Holcomb (District 10) changed parties from Democratic to Republican in August 2015.)	Tom Cotton (R)	John Boozman (R)	4R	Trump/ Pence (R) ✓
2017	Asa Hutchinson (R)	Tim Griffin (R)	Mark Martin (R)	Leslie Rutledge (R)	Andrea Lea (R)	Dennis Milligan (R)	John Thurston (R)	26R, 9D	76R, 24D (Note: Reps. Joe Jett, Jeff Wardlaw, and David Hillman all switched parties from Democratic to Republican before the 2017 legislative session.)	Tom Cotton (R)	John Boozman (R)	4R	Trump/ Pence (R) ✓
2018	Asa Hutchinson (R)	Tim Griffin (R)	Mark Martin (R)	Leslie Rutledge (R)	Andrea Lea (R)	Dennis Milligan (R)	John Thurston (R)	26R, 9D	76R, 24D	Tom Cotton (R)	John Boozman (R)	4R	Trump/ Pence (R) ✓
2019	Asa Hutchinson (R)	Tim Griffin (R)	John Thurston (R)	Leslie Rutledge (R)	Andrea Lea (R)	Dennis Milligan (R)	Tommy Land (R)	26R, 9D	76R, 24D	Tom Cotton (R)	John Boozman (R)	4R	Trump/ Pence (R) ✓
2020	Asa Hutchinson (R)	Tim Griffin (R)	John Thurston (R)	Leslie Rutledge (R)	Andrea Lea (R)	Dennis Milligan (R)	Tommy Land (R)	26R, 9D	76R, 24D	Tom Cotton (R)	John Boozman (R)	4R	Trump/ Pence (R) ✗
2021	Asa Hutchinson (R)	Tim Griffin (R)	John Thurston (R)	Leslie Rutledge (R)	Andrea Lea (R)	Dennis Milligan (R)	Tommy Land (R)	28R, 7D	78R, 22D	Tom Cotton (R)	John Boozman (R)	4R	Trump/ Pence (R) ✗
2022	Asa Hutchinson (R)	Tim Griffin (R)	John Thurston (R)	Leslie Rutledge (R)	Andrea Lea (R)	Dennis Milligan (R)	Tommy Land (R)	28R, 7D	78R, 22D	Tom Cotton (R)	John Boozman (R)	4R	Trump/ Pence (R) ✗
2023	Sarah Huckabee; Sanders (R)	Leslie Rutledge (R)	John Thurston (R)	Tim Griffin (R)	Dennis Milligan (R)	Mark Lowery (R)	Tommy Land (R)	29R, 6D	82R, 18D	Tom Cotton (R)	John Boozman (R)	4R	Trump/ Pence (R) ✗
2023	Sarah Huckabee; Sanders (R)	Leslie Rutledge (R)	John Thurston (R)	Tim Griffin (R)	Dennis Milligan (R)	Larry Walther (R)	Tommy Land (R)	29R, 6D	82R, 18D	Tom Cotton (R)	John Boozman (R)	4R	Trump/ Pence (R) ✗
2024	Sarah Huckabee; Sanders (R)	Leslie Rutledge (R)	John Thurston (R)	Tim Griffin (R)	Dennis Milligan (R)	Larry Walther (R)	Tommy Land (R)	29R, 6D	82R, 18D	Tom Cotton (R)	John Boozman (R)	4R	Trump/ Vance (R) ✓
2025	Sarah Huckabee; Sanders (R)	Leslie Rutledge (R)	Cole Jester (R)	Tim Griffin (R)	Dennis Milligan (R)	John Thurston (R)	Tommy Land (R)	29R, 6D	81R, 19D	Tom Cotton (R)	John Boozman (R)	4R	Trump/ Vance (R) ✓
2026	Sarah Huckabee; Sanders (R)	Leslie Rutledge (R)	Cole Jester (R)	Tim Griffin (R)	Dennis Milligan (R)	John Thurston (R)	Tommy Land (R)	29R, 6D	80R, 20D	Tom Cotton (R)	John Boozman (R)	4R	Trump/ Vance (R) ✓
2027	Sarah Huckabee; Sanders (R)	Leslie Rutledge (R)	Kim Hammer (R)	Tim Griffin (R)	Dennis Milligan (R)	John Thurston (R)	Cole Jester (R)	28R, 7D	70R, 30D	Tom Cotton (R)	John Boozman (R)	4R	Trump/ Vance (R) ✓

Key to party colors and abbreviations for members of the U.S. Congress and other politicians or officials
Alaskan Independence (AKIP) Know Nothing (KN) American Labor (AL) Anti-Jacksonian (Anti-J); National Republican (NR) Anti-Administration (AA) Anti-Masonic (Anti-M) Conservative (Con) Covenant (Cov)	Democratic (D) Democratic–Farmer–Labor (DFL) Democratic–NPL (D-NPL) Dixiecrat (Dix), States' Rights (SR) Democratic-Republican (DR) Farmer–Labor (FL) Federalist (F); Pro-Administration (PA)	Free Soil (FS) Fusion (Fus) Greenback (GB) Independence (IPM) Jacksonian (J) Liberal (Lib) Libertarian (L) National Union (NU)	Nonpartisan League (NPL) Nullifier (N) Opposition Northern (O); Opposition Southern (O) Populist (Pop) Progressive (Prog) Prohibition (Proh) Readjuster (Rea)	Republican (R) Silver (Sv) Silver Republican (SvR) Socialist (Soc) Union (U) Unconditional Union (UU) Vermont Progressive (VP) Whig (W)	Independent (I) Nonpartisan (NP)

== See also ==
- Government in Arkansas
