= 1934 Arkansas elections =

Arkansas held a general election on November 6, 1934. Held during a midterm year, the state did not vote for President or Senate in 1934. For the United States House of Representatives, each of Arkansas's seven Representatives sought re-election. Only David Delano Glover in the Arkansas 6th was challenged in the Democratic primary, he was defeated by John McClellan. Claude A. Fuller and Tilman B. Parks handily defeated Republican and Independent challengers for the Arkansas 3rd and Arkansas 7th, respectively.

All of Arkansas's statewide constitutional offices were up for reelection, including governor. During the Solid South, the Democratic Party held firm control of virtually every office in The South, including Arkansas. Winning the Democratic primary was considered tantamount to election, with several different factions of the party battling in the open primaries. Incumbent governor Junius Marion Futrell handily won re-election; all other state constitutional offices were held by the Democrats without general election opposition.

== State ==
=== Governor ===
County results, gubernatorial Futrell: 50–60% 60–70% 70–80% 80–90% 90%+ Ledbetter: 50–60% Butler: Did not win any counties

=== Lieutenant governor ===
Lee Cazort won reelection as Lieutenant Governor of Arkansas unopposed in the Democratic primary or general election.

=== Constitutional offices ===
==== Attorney general ====
Incumbent Hal L. Norwood was defeated in the Democratic primary by Carl E. Bailey, prosecuting attorney for the Sixth Judicial District of Arkansas.

Democratic primary, 1934
Party	Candidate	Votes	%
Democratic	Attorney General Hal L. Norwood	121,309	49.0
Democratic	Prosecuting Attorney Carl E. Bailey	126,171	51.0
Total votes		247,480	100.0

Bailey won the seat unopposed in the general election.

==== Secretary of State ====
Ed F. McDonald defeated challenger Crip Hall in the Democratic primary.

Democratic primary, 1934
Party	Candidate	Votes	%
Democratic	Secretary of State Ed F. McDonald	140,067	59.7
Democratic	Crip Hall	94,569	40.3
Total votes		234,636	100.0

McDonald won reelection as Arkansas Secretary of State unopposed in the general election.

==== Auditor ====
J. Oscar Humphrey defeated challengers Charlie Parker and R. W. Parrish in the Democratic primary.

Democratic primary, 1934
Party	Candidate	Votes	%
Democratic	Auditor J. Oscar Humphrey	117,263	47.8
Democratic	Charley Parker	76,000	31.0
Democratic	R. W. Parrish	52,017	21.2
Total votes		245,280	100.0

Humphrey won reelection as Arkansas Auditor of State unopposed in the general election.

==== Treasurer ====
Incumbent Roy V. Leonard was defeated in the Democratic primary by Earl Page.

Democratic primary, 1934
Party	Candidate	Votes	%
Democratic	Treasurer Roy V. Leonard	94,569	38.5
Democratic	Earl Page	151,160	61.5
Total votes		245,729	100.0

Page won election as Arkansas Treasurer of State unopposed in the general election.

==== State Land Commissioner ====
George W. Neal won reelection as Arkansas State Land Commissioner unopposed in the Democratic primary or general election.
