= Sharon Priest =

Canadian-American politician (born 1947)

Secretary of State of Arkansas
- In office 1994–2003
- Governor: Jim Guy Tucker; Mike Huckabee
- Preceded by: Bill McCuen
- Succeeded by: Charlie Daniels

70th Mayor of Little Rock
- In office 1991–1992
- Preceded by: Buddy Villines
- Succeeded by: Jim Daily Jr.

Personal details
- Born: Sharon Mary Devlin; September 2, 1947 (age 78) Montreal, Quebec, Canada
- Party: Democratic
- Spouse: Bill Priest (m. 1974)
- Children: 1

Sharon Mary Priest (née Devlin; born September 12, 1947) is a Canadian-American politician and businessperson. Priest was mayor of Little Rock, Arkansas from 1991 to 1992 before being the first woman elected to the role of Secretary of State of Arkansas in 1994. She was re-elected in 1998 and her tenure ended in 2003. During her terms in office, she introduced an internet-based Information Network of Arkansas, encouraged participation in elections and in the 2000 US Census, and worked towards electoral reform. She also served as president of the National Association of Secretaries of State.

== Background ==
Priest was born on September 12, 1947, in Montreal, Quebec. She worked in Canada with a distributor for the American company Munsey Products before moving to Little Rock, Arkansas, upon her marriage in 1974. While in Little Rock, Priest prepared taxes for H & R Block from 1976 to 1978 and worked at a real estate company she had opened from 1983 to 1986. She later was a membership director for a chamber of commerce from 1990 to 1994.

During this time period, Priest started her political career as a member of the board of directors (city council) for Little Rock in 1986. For the city, she was the deputy mayor of Little Rock from 1989 to 1990 and reappointed to the board of directors in 1990. The following year, Priest became the mayor of Little Rock in January and held her mayorship until December 1992.

Running as a Democrat in 1994, Priest beat Julia Hughes Jones to become the Secretary of State of Arkansas. With her win, Priest became the first woman to take office as Secretary of State of Arkansas as the result of an election. Overall, Priest was the second woman to become Arkansas's secretary of state, as Nancy J. Hall was appointed after her husband died during his office term in 1961.

Priest was reelected as Arkansas's Secretary of State in 1998, defeating candidate Rose Bryant Jones. She remained as Secretary of State for Arkansas until 2003. During her years in office, Priest made information about the state government, and held in the office of the Secretary of State, more accessible. In 1995, she launched the internet-based Information Network of Arkansas, and also reduced the cost of photocopies of information held in the Secretary of State's offices from 80c per page to 25c per page. She attempted to boost the number of people voting in elections through programs such as "Honor a Vet with a Vote", designed to raise awareness "that voting is a precious right", and Mock Election, a program for high schools students which won an award offered by Time Magazine/National Association of State Boards of Education. During 2000, she visited all counties of Arkansas to encourage participation in the federal census, after estimates that around 42,000 residents of Arkansas were omitted from the 1990 US census, resulting in a loss of $280,000,000 in federal funding. Priest also served as president of the National Association of Secretaries of State, and chaired a committee of the association which investigated possible election reforms at the national level, and made 15 recommendations intended to avoid the voting problems of the 2000 US presidential election. Within Arkansas, Priest also wanted to change the method of tracking ballots, so that they would no longer be linked to individual voters. However, the proposed electoral reforms foundered due to a downturn in the economy, and Priest was reported as saying, "Unless there's a real uprising on the part of the people in this country who will call their congressmen and senators and say, "Elections are important to us and democracy comes at a price, and we're willing to pay that price – do something!" then I'm not sure, running into budgets now, that anything's going to get done."

After her governmental position for Arkansas ended, Priest worked at the Downtown Little Rock Partnership from 2003 to 2015 as an executive director. In the late 2010s, Priest became a bookkeeper for a plumbing company run by her son.

Party political offices
Preceded by Bill McCuen	Democratic nominee for Secretary of State of Arkansas; 1994, 1998	Succeeded by Charlie Daniels
