= J. Carroll Cone =

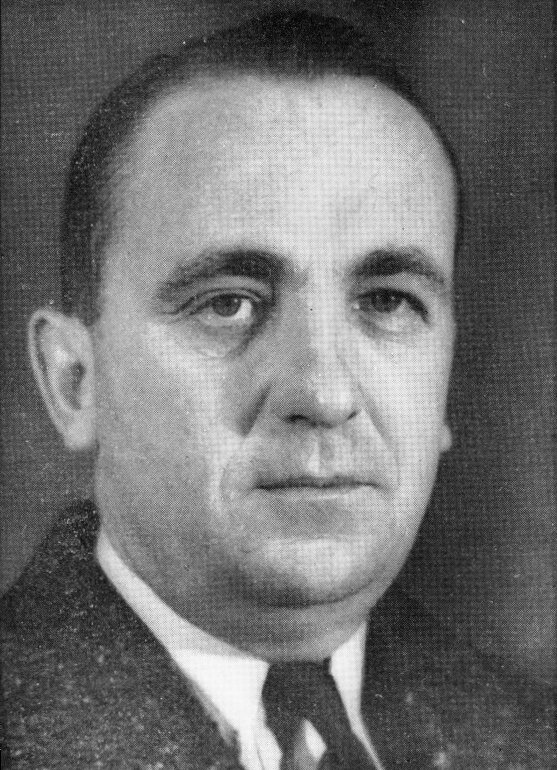

Arkansas State Auditor
- In office 1925–1929
- Preceded by: James Guy Tucker Sr.
- Succeeded by: J. Oscar Humphrey

Personal details
- Born: July 4, 1891 Ashley County, Arkansas
- Died: August 11, 1976 (aged 85) Walter Reed National Military Medical Center; Bethesda, Maryland
- Resting place: Arlington National Cemetery
- Party: Democratic
- Education: Ouachita Baptist University

Military service
- Allegiance: United States
- Branch/service: Army Air Service
- Rank: Lieutenant colonel
- Battles/wars: World War I

John Carrol Cone (July 4, 1891 – August 11, 1976) was an aviation executive, politician, and World War I pilot.

== Early life ==
Cone was born on July 4, 1891 in rural Snyder, Arkansas to Jesse H. and Annie A. Cone, a prominent family in Southeast Arkansas. He attended Ouachita Baptist College before enlisting in the United States Army during World War I, where he volunteered for the Army Air Service. Cone flew missions over Europe as a fighter pilot and later became a training instructor.

== Political career ==
After the war, Cone returned to Arkansas and sold cars before taking a job as assistant Secretary of State of Arkansas for Tom Terral from 1920 to 1921. He sought and won election as Arkansas State Auditor, and served two two-year terms in Little Rock, Arkansas. Cone worked to establish an air wing for the Arkansas National Guard, including with President Calvin Coolidge to create the 154th Observation Squadron, which became the Arkansas Air National Guard.

Cone challenged incumbent Harvey Parnell for the Democratic nomination during the 1930 Arkansas gubernatorial election, but finished fourth in a seven-man field.
