= Martha Shoffner =

American politician

36th Treasurer of Arkansas
- In office January 9, 2007 – May 21, 2013
- Governor: Mike Bebee
- Preceded by: Gus Wingfield
- Succeeded by: Charles Robinson

Member of the Arkansas House of Representatives from the 79th district
- In office 1997–2003

Personal details
- Born: 1944 or 1945 (age 81–82)
- Party: Democratic
- Education: Memphis State University Arkansas State University
- Profession: Real estate

Martha Shoffner is the former state treasurer of Arkansas. A Democrat, she was first elected in 2006, taking office in January 2007. She was re-elected in 2010.

== History ==
Shoffner was born and raised in Jackson County. Born to a farmer and a school teacher, she graduated from Newport High School and attended Memphis State University and Arkansas State University. She started working in advertising and is also a licensed real estate agent.

== Career ==
Shoffner was elected to the Arkansas House of Representatives in 1996.

After being term limited, she was an unsuccessful candidate for the Democratic nomination for the state auditor. In 2005, Shoffner announced her candidacy for State Treasurer on the steps of the Jackson County Courthouse. After being outspent almost 3-to-1 Shoffner was elected to the office in 2006.

== Arrest ==
On May 18, 2013, the FBI arrested Shoffner on a charge of extortion. Following her release on bail, Shoffner resigned as Arkansas State Treasurer on May 21, 2013.

She was subsequently indicted on June 5, 2013, by a Federal Grand Jury on six counts of extortion under color of official right, one count of attempted extortion under color of official right, and seven counts of receipt of a bribe by an agent of a state government receiving federal funds. She was convicted of all counts on March 11, 2014, by a jury of seven women and five men. On August 28, 2015, she was sentenced to two-and-a-half years in federal prison. Shoffner reported to prison on November 3, 2015 and was released from there in September 2017.

Party political offices
Preceded by Gus Wingfield	Democratic nominee for Treasurer of Arkansas; 2006, 2010	Succeeded by Karen Sealy Garcia
Political offices
Preceded by Gus Wingfield	Arkansas State Treasurer; 2007–2013	Succeeded by Charles Robinson
