= John M. Parker (New York politician) =

American politician and judge (1805–1873)

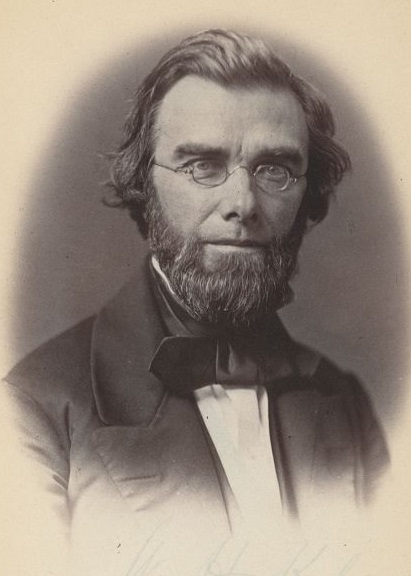
- Born: John Mason Parker; June 14, 1805; Granville, New York, U.S.
- Died: December 16, 1873 (aged 68); Owego, New York, U.S.
- Resting place: Evergreen Cemetery
- Education: Middlebury College
- Occupations: Politician; judge
- Spouse(s): Catherine Ann Pumpelly (m. 1835; died 1845) Stella A. Pumpelly (m. 1854)
- Children: 4, including Charles
- Father: John C. Parker

John Mason Parker (June 14, 1805 – December 16, 1873) was an American congressman from New York's 27th congressional district. He served as justice of the New York Supreme Court from 1859 to his death in 1873.

== Early life ==
John Mason Parker was born in Granville, New York, on June 14, 1805, to John C. Parker. His father was a justice of the New York Supreme Court. He attended Granville Academy and Castleton Seminary, graduated from Middlebury College in 1828. He read law in the office of John P. Cushman in Troy. He was admitted to the bar in 1833.

== Career ==
Parker began a practice in Owego, New York, in 1833. In 1854, Parker was elected to Congress, representing the 27th district (later the 28th district) as a Whig candidate, and he was reelected as a Republican in 1856, serving from March 4, 1855 to March 3, 1859. Parker was not a candidate for renomination in 1858.

On November 8, 1859, Parker was elected justice of the New York Supreme Court to an eight-year term. He was re-elected in 1867 to a term of 14 years. On December 25, 1870, he was appointed to a general term by Governor John T. Hoffman and served as a justice with the third department of the court. He served with the court until his death. During his time on the bench, Parker was appointed as a sitting judge on the New York Court of Appeals in January 1867.

He was a charter trustee of Cornell University from 1865 to 1870.

== Personal life ==
Parker married Catherine Ann Pumpelly, daughter of Charles Pumpelly, of Owego in September 1835. They had four children, including Charles and Francis Henry. His son Charles also served on the New York Supreme Court. His wife died in 1845. He married Stella A. Pumpelly, another daughter of Charles Pumpelly, on March 1, 1854. He was a member of St. Paul's Church in Owego.

Parker died at his home in Owego on December 16, 1873, and was buried in Owego's Evergreen Cemetery.

== Awards ==
Parker was awarded an honorary Doctor of Laws degree from Middlebury College in 1865.

U.S. House of Representatives
Preceded by John J. Taylor	Member of the U.S. House of Representatives from New York's 27th congressional district 1855–1859	Succeeded by Alfred Wells
