= James Herbert Jones =

American governmental official

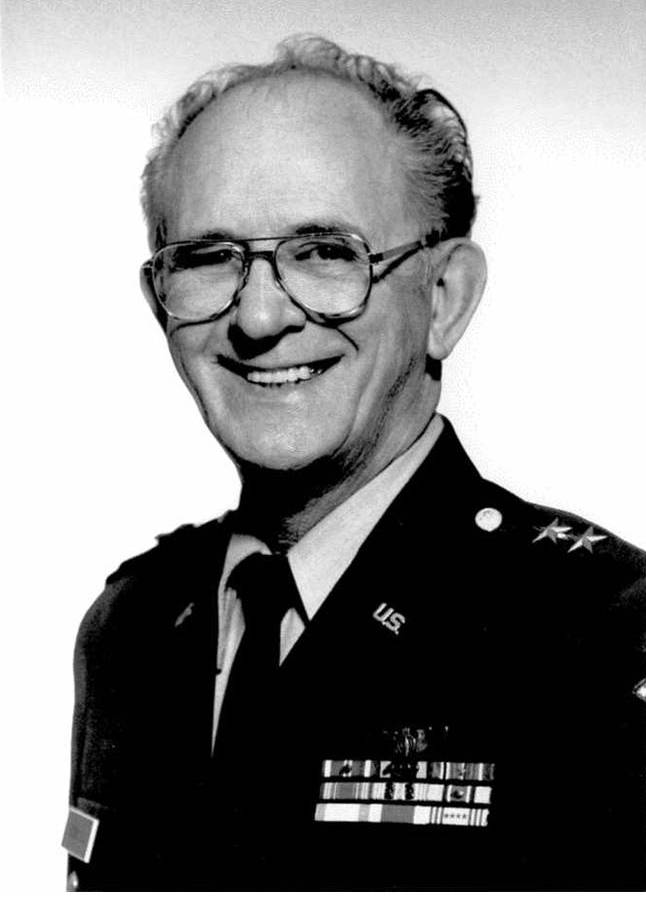
Major General James H. Jones

James Herbert "Jimmie Red" Jones (March 14, 1920 – September 1, 2008) was the Arkansas State Auditor from 1956 to 1980 the Adjutant General of the Arkansas National Guard from 1979 to 1981 and 1983 to 1984.

== Early life ==
Jones was born in Magnolia, Arkansas, where he grew up and attended high school. He was a standout high school football player, and captain of his team. Jones attended Southern State University, where he played college football, serving there as a team captain as well. He played with Charlie McClendon, who later became the longtime head coach of Louisiana State University. After college, Jones attended the University of Arkansas School of Law, and Keegan's School of Radio and Television in Memphis, Tennessee.

Jones had a varied early work career, working as a store clerk, gas station attendant, and a "roughnecker" and "switcher" in the oil fields, before moving on to his long career in the military and public service. He was a very devoted son to his mother and during his late 1950ss when she was sick in a nursing home in Magnolia would drive each week the three hours from Little Rock to bring her her favorite dinner and sit with her for an hour or two and then make the long drive home to Little Rock. He developed a reputation for honesty and kindness, part of his political success. While he was State Auditor he drove older cars to conserve state funds and was always humble about his duties as a public servant.

== Military service ==
Jones first joined the Arkansas National Guard in 1938, but did not enter active service until October 1942. After entering active service he was trained as a bombardier and, at the end of 1943, was commissioned as a second lieutenant in the U.S. Army Air Corps. He commanded the 93 Bomb Group, and flew thirty combat missions with this group. In 1944 he was promoted to first lieutenant, and in 1945 he was removed from active duty and put in the Officers Reserve Corps. For his combat service and valor he was awarded the Distinguished Flying Cross with Oak Leaf Cluster, Air Medal with four Oak Leaf Clusters, Joint Service Medal, European-African Middle Eastern Campaign Medal, five Bronze Stars and the World War II Victory Medal. He served as Commander of The American Legion Department of Arkansas.

=== Arkansas National Guard ===
Jones joined the Arkansas National Guard at age 18, and remained a member for the rest of his life. He was made Adjutant General of the State National Guard twice after the end of his tenure as State Auditor. The first tenure was from 1979 to 1981, and the second was from 1983 to 1984. His path to becoming the State Commander of the National Guard was long and steady. In 1951, he was promoted to captain and given responsibilities as the adjutant, communications, and motor officer of the 206 Tank Battalion. He was transferred to the National Guard state headquarters in 1961, where he was promoted to major and given new duties. In 1967, he was again promoted, this time to lieutenant colonel, in which authority he served as State Inspector and Director of Supply and Maintenance, and, in 1971, he was promoted to colonel. After his promotion to Colonel he transferred to the U.S. Army Reserve Control, where he served until being made Adjutant General. He reached the rank of major general in this capacity before his retirement. He received the Legion of Merit and the Armed Forces Reserve Medal as awards for his service.

== Political career ==
Jones's political career began in 1950, with his election to the first of two terms as Columbia County, Arkansas Tax Collector. In the same time period he was a leading organizer in the Magnolia chapters of the Chamber of Commerce, and the Veterans of Foreign Wars. During this time he also served as the Southern State College Alumni Association President and other community organizations.

Arkansas Governor Francis Cherry appointed Jones as State Lands Commissioner in 1955, a position he served for just over a year, before being elected Arkansas State Auditor in 1956. He was then reelected to 11 two-year terms before retiring in 1978. Jones served as Governor Bill Clinton's campaign manager in his 1982 reelection campaign, and remained a Democratic Activist, including serving as a major fundraiser for Clinton and the State Party. He died in Hot Springs, Arkansas at age 88.

Political offices
| Preceded by F. Nolan Humphrey | Arkansas State Auditor; 1957–1979 | Succeeded by Jimmie Lou Fisher |
