= Arkansas State Auditor =

Executive accountant for Arkansas, US

Auditor of State
- Seal of the Auditor
- Incumbent; Dennis Milligan since January 2023
- Style: The Honorable
- Term length: Four years
- Constituting instrument: Arkansas Constitution, Amendment 63, Article 6
- Precursor: Territorial Auditor; Arkansaw Territory; July 4, 1819–June 15, 1836
- Formation: June 15, 1836
- First holder: Elias N. Conway
- Succession: Statewide election
- Salary: $85,000
- Website: www.auditor.ar.gov

The Arkansas state auditor (formally known as the auditor of state) is a constitutional officer within the executive branch of the U.S. state of Arkansas. Thirty-five individuals have occupied the office of state auditor since statehood. The incumbent is Dennis Milligan, a Republican who took office in 2023.

== Powers and duties ==
In Arkansas, the state auditor serves as the general accountant or "bookkeeper" of state government. As such, the auditor is responsible for preauditing claims against the state, issuing warrants on the state treasury in payment of claims approved, accounting for monthly revenues, expenditures, and cash balances by fund, enforcing the state's unclaimed property laws, and administering payroll to state legislators, elected executive branch officials and the judiciary.

While the state auditor is the general accountant for the state, the auditor does not act as the state's comptroller, which in the public sector is typically responsible for statewide financial accounting and reporting. That function is instead performed by the Arkansas Department of Finance and Administration, which operates under the direction and supervision of the governor. Similarly, the state auditor does not conduct financial or performance postaudits of state agencies and local governments. Rather, that is the job of the Division of Legislative Audit, whose head is appointed by and reports to the state legislature. Instead, the state auditor's office occupies a role similar to that performed by accounts payable departments in the private sector.

== History ==
The auditor's office was created on July 4, 1819, when Arkansaw Territory was created from the Missouri Territory. All constitutional officers of Arkansas were appointed by a joint session of the General Assembly of Arkansas Territory, except the governor. Upon statehood in 1836, the position took the current name. When the Arkansas Constitution of 1868 was ratified during the Reconstruction era, direct election of constitutional officers was among the reforms listed in the new document. Auditors were elected to four-year terms in partisan elections. This system remained in place when the Arkansas Constitution of 1874 was adopted, which remains in effect today.

Prior to Amendment 63 in 1982, the term length for constitutional offices in Arkansas, including Auditor, was two years.

== List of Arkansas state auditors ==
No. (Note: Acting auditors are not numbered.)	Name	Party (Note: Appointed and acting auditors do not have a party listed.)	Service	Notes
1	Elias N. Conway	None	June 15, 1836 – May 17, 1841	
acting	A. Boileau	None	May 17, 1841 – July 5, 1841	
1	Elias N. Conway	None	July 5, 1841 – 1849	
2	Christopher C. Danley	None	1849–1855	(Note: Resigned)
acting	William Miller	None	1854–1855	
3	A.S. Huey	None	1855–1857	
4	William Miller	None	1857–1860	
acting	H.C. Lowe	None	March 5, 1860 – January 24, 1861	
4	William Miller	None	1861–1864	Arkansas was within the Confederate States of America
5	J.R. Berry	Republican	1864–1866	
6	William Miller	Democratic	1866–1868	
7	J.R. Berry	Republican	1868–1873	
8	Stephen Wheeler	Republican	1873–1874	
9	William Miller	Democratic	1874–1877	
10	John Crawford	Democratic	1877–1883	
11	Abner W. Files	Democratic	1883–1887	
12	William Miller	Democratic	1877 – November 29, 1887	Died in office
13	W. S. Dunlop	Democratic	November 30, 1887 – 1893	Initially appointed, later elected
14	C.B. Mills	Democratic	1893–1897	
15	Clay Sloan	Democratic	1897–1901	
16	T.C. Monroe	Democratic	1901–1905	
17	Avery E. Moore	Democratic	1905–1909	
18	John R. Jobe	Democratic	1909–1912	
19	John M. Oathout	Democratic	1912–1913	Resigned shortly before death
20	L.L. Coffman	None	June 13, 1913 – 1915	Appointed to fill unexpired term
21	M.F. Dickinson	None	1915–1917	
22	Hogan Oliver	Democratic	1917 – January 1, 1921	Resigned
23	James Guy Tucker	Democratic	1921–1925	Appointed to fill unexpired term
24	J. Carroll Cone	Democratic	1925–1929	
25	J. Oscar Humphrey	Democratic	1929–1935	
26	Charles E. Parker	Democratic	1935–1937	
27	J. Oscar Humphrey	Democratic	1937 – April 2, 1956	Died in office
28	F. Nolan Humphrey	None	1956	Appointed to fill unexpired term
29	James Herbert "Jimmie Red" Jones	Democratic	1957–1979	Resigned upon being appointed Adjutant General of the Arkansas National Guard
30	Jimmie Lou Fisher	None	1979–1981	Appointed to fill unexpired term
31	Julia Hughes Jones	Democratic	1981–1995	
31	Julia Hughes Jones	Republican 1993–1995	1981–1995	
32	Gus Wingfield	Democratic	1995–2003	
33	Jim Wood	Democratic	2003–2011	
34	Charlie Daniels	Democratic	2011–2015	
35	Andrea Lea	Republican	2015–2023	
36	Dennis Milligan	Republican	2023–present	
