= Gus Wingfield =

American politician (1926–2024)

35th Treasurer of Arkansas
- In office 2003–2007
- Governor: Mike Huckabee
- Preceded by: Jimmie Lou Fisher
- Succeeded by: Martha Shoffner

36th Arkansas State Auditor
- In office 1995–2003
- Governor: Jim Guy Tucker; Mike Huckabee
- Preceded by: Julia Hughes Jones
- Succeeded by: Jim Wood

Personal details
- Born: September 17, 1926 Antoine, Arkansas, U.S.
- Died: January 21, 2024 (aged 97) Delight, Arkansas, U.S.
- Party: Democratic
- Spouse: Alice Wingfield

James Gus Wingfield (September 17, 1926 – January 21, 2024) was an American politician who was a one-term Arkansas State Treasurer from 2003 to 2007, and a two-term Arkansas State Auditor from 1994 to 2003.

== Early life ==
James Gus Wingfield was born in Antoine, Arkansas, on September 17, 1926. He went to a public school in the nearby town of Delight, Arkansas. He served in the Air Force, and was a veteran of both World War II and the Korean War. After the Korean War he attended college at the Southern Technical Institute in Dallas, Texas, and later went to the University of Arkansas.

=== Business career ===
Wingfield became a respected employee at the Bank of Delight, where his savviness and intelligence, as well as his well connected family, helped him quickly rise through the ranks. In 1968, he was hired as Executive Vice President and a member of the Board of Directors. He went on to hold that position for over 22 years, until he retired to serve as State Auditor.

== Early political career ==
Wingfield was elected in the mid-1970s to the Delight School Board. In 1978 he lost his first race for the Arkansas General Assembly by just over 300 votes. In 1980 he ran again and won the District 18 seat. He served a total of 14 years as a State Representative, during which he became highly respected, and well known within Democratic circles, which helped him in the 1994 primary for State Auditor.

=== 1994 election as State Auditor ===
Wingfield left the State House of Representatives to run for State Auditor in the Republican year of 1994, however, their gains in Arkansas were minimal. The most competitive part of the race was the primary, which he narrowly won, defeating fellow State Representative Bobby Tullis by just over 3 percentage points. He went on to easily win the General Election, defeating the Republican candidate 63-37. He went on to serve two terms as State Auditor.

In 2002, when Democrat Jimmie Lou Fisher, the long time State Treasurer of Arkansas, having served the maximum number of terms under the 1994 terms limits approved by Arkansas voters, ran against incumbent Republican Mike Huckabee, Gus Wingfield ran for her open State Treasurer Seat. He won the Democratic primary easily, and ended up winning what was a surprisingly competitive and close statewide race against Randy Bynum. Wingfield took only 57% of the vote in that election, which turned out to be his smallest margin in the three statewide elections he has run, and in his entire political career.

=== Political views ===
Wingfield was considered a part of the conservative wing of the U.S. Democratic Party.

=== Retirement ===
In 2006, Wingfield said he had no intentions of running for further public office, and that he would like to enjoy retirement before he died. He told Arkansas News Bureau, "We're looking at a great trip. We want to catch Amtrak and go up through Canada and all the away across Canada and view the Rockies, do stuff like that."

Wingfield died in Delight, Arkansas, on January 21, 2024, at the age of 97.

== Election history ==
2002 General Election

Candidate	Votes	%
Gus Wingfield (D)	445,639	57.49
Randy Bynum (R)	329,428	42.51
Gus Wingfield (D) elected State Treasurer		

- Unopposed in 1998 reelection.

1994 General Election

Candidate	Votes	%
Gus Wingfield (D)	423,407	62.96
Darrell Glascock (R)	249,051	37.04
Gus Wingfield (D) reelected		

1994 Democratic Primary

Candidate	Votes	%
Gus Wingfield (D)	166,856	51.84
Bobby Tullis (D)	155,018	48.16
Gus Wingfield (D)		

Party political offices
Preceded by Julia Hughes Jones	Democratic nominee for Arkansas State Auditor; 1994, 1998	Succeeded by Jim Wood
Preceded by Jimmie Lou Fisher	Democratic nominee for Treasurer of Arkansas; 2002	Succeeded by Martha Shoffner
Political offices
Preceded by Julia Hughes Jones	Arkansas State Auditor; 1995–2003	Succeeded by Jim Wood
Preceded by Jimmie Lou Fisher	Arkansas State Treasurer; 2003–2007	Succeeded by Martha Shoffner
