= Jim Wood (Arkansas politician) =

American politician

37th Arkansas State Auditor
- In office 2003–2011
- Governor: Mike Huckabee; Mike Beebe
- Preceded by: Gus Wingfield
- Succeeded by: Charlie Daniels

Member of the Arkansas House of Representatives from the 80th district
- In office January 13, 1997 – January 2003
- Preceded by: Butch Calhoun
- Succeeded by: Tommy Dickinson

Member of the Arkansas Senate
- In office January 8, 1979 – January 14, 1991
- Preceded by: Robert Harvey
- Succeeded by: Steve Bell
- Constituency: 27th district (1979–1983); 10th district (1983–1991

Personal details
- Born: Newport, Arkansas, U.S.
- Party: Democratic
- Spouse: Ann Wood

Jim Wood, an American politician, is a former State Auditor of the U.S. state of Arkansas, and is a former State Legislator. He served from 2003 to 2011.

== Biography ==
Jim Wood was born in Newport, Arkansas, and attended elementary school in Tupelo, Arkansas. He attended college at Arkansas State Teacher's College in Conway, Arkansas.

Wood has worked as a farmer and businessman, serving two years on the Woodruff County Quorum Court, before running for State Senate. He later served as a State Senator from 1979 to 1991, and as a State Representative from 1997 to 2002. He is an active member of the Southern Legislative Conference, and Agricultural Advisory Board.

In 1986, Wood was a surprise entry against First District Representative Bill Alexander in the Democratic Primary. In a campaign managed by Darrell Glascock, the consultant credited for the victory of Tommy Robinson in the Second District two years before, he pushed Alexander to his narrowest win since his election in 1968. Alexander prevailed by a vote of 81,409 (52.15%) to Wood's 74,701 (47.85%).

He has won many awards over the courses of careers, starting with being named one of the top three Young Ranchers and Farmers in Arkansas by the Farm Bureau in 1974, and 1976. The State Employees Association named him Outstanding Freshman Legislator in 1979, and numerous awards for his service to the military, including several from Disabled American Veterans and the Veterans of Foreign Wars association.

=== Statewide politics ===
Wood was first elected in 2002, winning 57.65% of the vote, defeating Republican Mary Jane Rebick. In 2006, he was reelected with 85% of the vote against third party opposition. He won reelection with nearly six hundred thousand votes. He is a lifelong Democrat.

=== State Auditor ===
As State Auditor, Wood ran a program to give unclaimed valuables back to Arkansans, with over one hundred million dollars' worth of assets in all, including twenty-one million dollars collected in the 2006–2007 fiscal year alone. It is part of the State Auditor's job to locate abandoned bank accounts, stock certificates, mineral royalties and other lost assets. The goal of the project was to find the owners of the assets, which companies hand over to the government when legal owners cannot be found.

The other duties of State Auditor are primarily concerned with fiscal matters. The Constitutional office serves as an accountant, keeping track of state money that is used and spent by various departments, and also disburses federal money to various offices. As Auditor, Wood was a de facto member of the Arkansas Public Employees Retirement System and the Arkansas Teachers Retirement System, which manages their retirement funds.

=== Election history ===
Jim Wood has faced several statewide reelections with relatively easy victories, winning against only an unheralded third-party candidate in 2006.

2006 General Election

Candidate	Votes	%
Jim Wood (D)	597,550	84.87
Michael Joseph Bolzenius (G)	106,515	15.13
Jim Wood (D) reelected State Auditor		

2002 General Election

Candidate	Votes	%
Jim Wood (D)	442,349	57.65
Mary Jane Rebick (R)	324,279	42.35
Jim Wood (D) elected State Auditor		

Party political offices
Preceded by Gus Wingfield	Democratic nominee for Arkansas State Auditor; 2002, 2006	Succeeded by Charlie Daniels
Political offices
Preceded by Gus Wingfield	Arkansas State Auditor; 2003-2011	Succeeded by Charlie Daniels (politician)
