= Secretary of State of Arkansas =

Cabinet officer in the government of the U.S. state of Arkansas

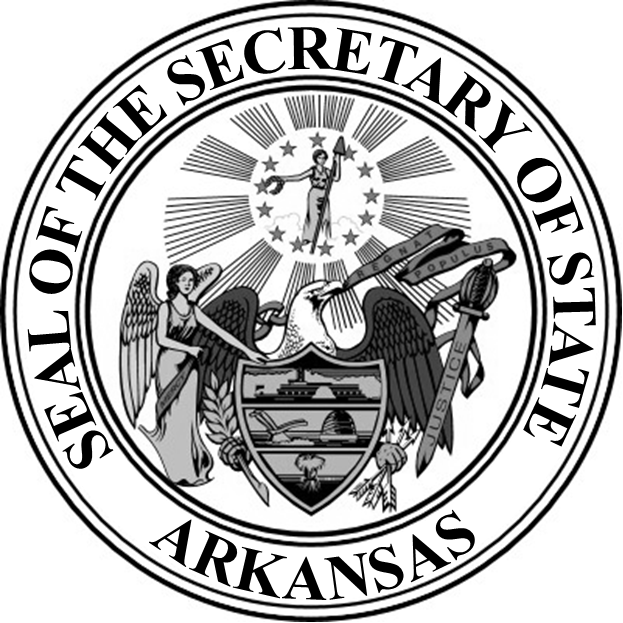
- Seal of the secretary of state
- Incumbent; Cole Jester since January 1, 2025
- Government of Arkansas
- Style: Mr. Secretary (informal); The Honorable (formal)
- Seat: State Capitol, Little Rock, Arkansas
- Term length: Four years, renewable once (Seventy-third Amendment to the Arkansas Constitution of 1874)
- Constituting instrument: Arkansas Constitution of 1836
- Precursor: Secretary of Arkansas Territory
- Formation: September 16, 1836 (189 years ago)
- First holder: Robert A. Watkins
- Salary: $54,305
- Website: sos.arkansas.gov

The Arkansas secretary of state is one of the elected constitutional officers of the U.S. State of Arkansas.

The current Secretary of State is Republican Cole Jester who was appointed by Governor Sarah Huckabee Sanders after John Thurston became the state treasurer.

== Organization ==
The secretary of state's office is composed of seven divisions:

- The Building & Grounds Division maintains the Arkansas State Capitol and its surrounding grounds and gardens.
- The Business & Commercial Services Division is responsible for filing liens pursuant to the Uniform Commercial Code, registering business entities and trademarks, collecting the state franchise tax, and licensing notaries public.
- The Communications & Education Division provides public education about civics and the History of Arkansas, and produces various state publications.
- The Elections Division administers elections, regulates campaign finance and lobbying, and ensures compliance with state and federal election laws.
- The Fiscal Office deals with the internal financial, logistical, and personnel matters of the Office of the Secretary of State. They also distribute the Arkansas and United States flag.
- The secretary also runs the State Capitol gift shop.
- The State Capitol Police provide security for the State Capitol building and police services for the Capitol Complex.

== Other duties ==
The Secretary of State also publishes the state's administrative regulations and the state gazette, the Arkansas Register.

== Officeholders ==
Democrats were elected exclusively to the office of secretary of state from the later Reconstruction era until the retirement of Charlie Daniels to run for State Auditor in 2010, when the first modern-day Republican to hold the office, Mark Martin, was elected. Secretaries of State during the statehood of Arkansas include:

- Robert A. Watkins (D) 1836–1840
- D. B. Greer 1840–1842
- John Winfrey (D) 1842
- D. B. Greer (D) 1842–1859
- Alexander Boileau (D) 1859–1860
- S. W. Weaver (D) 1860
- John I. Stirman (D) 1860–1862
- O. H. Oates (Confederate) 1862–1864
- Robert J. T. White (R) 1864–1871
- James M. Johnson (R) 1871–1874
- Benton B. Beavers (D) 1874–1879
- Jacob Frolich (D) 1879–1885
- Elias B. Moore (D) 1885–1889
- Benjamin Boone Chism (D) 1889–1893
- H. B. Armistead (D) 1893–1897
- Alexander C. Hull (D) 1897–1901
- J. W. Crockett (D) 1901–1905
- O. C. Ludwig (D) 1905–1911
- Earle W. Hodges (D) 1911–1917
- Tom J. Terral (D) 1917–1921
- Ira C. Hopper (D) 1921–1925
- Jim B. Higgins (D) 1925–1931
- Ed F. McDonald (D) 1931–1937
- C. G. "Crip" Hall (D) 1937–1961
- Nancy J. Hall (D) 1961–1963
- Kelly Bryant (D) 1963–1975
- George O. Jernigan Jr. (D) 1975–1977
- Winston Bryant (D) 1977–1979
- Paul Riviere (D) 1979–1985
- William J. "Bill" McCuen (D) 1985–1995
- Sharon M. Priest (D) 1995–2003
- Charlie Daniels (D) 2003–2011
- Mark Martin (R) 2011–2019
- John Thurston (R) 2019–2025
- Cole Jester (R) 2025–present

== See also ==
- List of company registers
