= F. Nolan Humphrey =

American politician

Arkansas State Auditor
- In office 1956–1956
- Governor: Orval Faubus
- Preceded by: J. Oscar Humphrey
- Succeeded by: Carleton Harris

Personal details
- Born: August 29, 1918 Horatio, Arkansas
- Died: July 18, 2012 (aged 93)
- Party: Democrat
- Spouse: Ethel Bulloch Humphrey
- Children: 2
- Education: University of Arkansas,

F. Nolan Humphrey (August 29, 1918 – July 18, 2012) was an American politician from Southwest Arkansas, who served as the Arkansas State Auditor in 1956. Humphrey had been appointed to fill the unexpired term of his father.
