= Jimmie Lou Fisher =

American politician (1941–2022)

Treasurer of Arkansas
- In office January 19, 1981 – January 14, 2003
- Governor: Frank White; Bill Clinton; Jim Tucker; Mike Huckabee
- Preceded by: Nancy Hall
- Succeeded by: Gus Wingfield

Auditor of Arkansas
- In office February 1979 – January 19, 1981
- Governor: Bill Clinton
- Preceded by: Jimmie Jones
- Succeeded by: Julia Jones

Personal details
- Born: Jimmie Lou Cooper; December 31, 1941 Delight, Arkansas, U.S.
- Died: July 11, 2022 (aged 80) Paragould, Arkansas, U.S.
- Party: Democratic
- Education: Arkansas State University, Jonesboro (BA)

Jimmie Lou Fisher (née Cooper; December 31, 1941 – July 11, 2022) was an American politician from Arkansas. A Democrat, she was the longest serving State Treasurer in Arkansas history.

== Early life and career ==
Jimmie Lou Cooper was born in Delight, Arkansas on December 31, 1941, the eldest of the five children of Joyce Nutt Cooper and Tollie H. Cooper. Her father was a professional basketball player and school teacher and her mother was a high school basketball coach. During her childhood, the family relocated to five different towns in Greene and Faulkner counties when her father took a job as a school superintendent. She attended school at Delaplaine School in Delaplaine, Arkansas. She graduated from Vilonia High School, and attended Arkansas State College in Jonesboro, Arkansas. She married George Fisher in 1959, and started her career working for the Arkansas Louisiana Gas Company. She and her husband had a son who died in infancy, and their marriage ended in the late 1970s. After working in a department store, an insurance firm and accounting firm, Fisher began her political career. Then she became an active member of the local Democratic Party. She was elected Treasurer of Greene County, Arkansas, in 1970, and went on to serve four two-year terms, until in 1979, when newly elected Governor Bill Clinton, appointed her Auditor of State.

Aside from that, she was very active in Democratic politics at the same time. She served as Vice Chairman of the Arkansas Democratic State Committee from 1976 to 1978 and went on to serve as a member of the Democratic National Committee during the same time period, 1976–1978. In 1978, she helped run then Arkansas Attorney General Bill Clinton's ultimately successful run for governor, serving as his 1st Congressional District Coordinator.

== Other Democratic activism ==
Fisher is noted as one of the major women in Arkansas politics, and one of the better known, and high-powered Arkansas Democratic activists. Positions she has held include:

- Vice Chairman of Democratic State Committee, 1976–78, November 1991 – September 1993
- Member of Democratic National Committee, 1976–78, and November 1991 – September 1993
- Past President of the Arkansas Democratic Women's Club
- Delegate to the Democratic National Convention, 1988, 1992, 1996, 2000
- Member of the Credentials Committee, Democratic National Convention 1976

== Tenure as state treasurer ==
Jimmie Lou Fisher served as Auditor of State for one year. In 1980 she ran for state treasurer when Nancy Hall, the first woman ever elected as a statewide constitutional officer in Arkansas, retired after serving 18 years. Fisher easily won the primary due to her powerful connections within the Arkansas Democratic Party. She then went on to win the General Election just as easily, and in doing so, became only the third woman ever to be elected to statewide office in Arkansas (behind Hall and Senator Hattie Caraway). She then went on to win three two-year terms as state treasurer, and four four-year terms, serving a total of 22 years as state treasurer, making her the longest serving state treasurer in the history of Arkansas, and placing her among its longest serving statewide officials.

In 1987 she served as Vice President for the Southern Region of the National Association of State Auditors, Comptrollers and Treasurers. Later, in 1990, she served as President of the National Association of State Treasurers.

Fisher was a very active state treasurer. In 1995 she was a delegate to the White House Conference on Aging, and was later appointed to the Rural Telephone Commission by President Bill Clinton.

While Treasurer, Fisher served as a member of the board of Arkansas Development Finance Authority, the Arkansas Public Employees Retirement System Board, the Arkansas Teacher Retirement System Board, and was a member and Secretary of the Arkansas State Board of Finance.

== 2002 gubernatorial race ==
In 2002 the Arkansas Democratic Party asked Fisher to be its candidate against Mike Huckabee, because they felt that she was the strongest candidate possible. They did not want to allow the highly popular Huckabee to blow past the opposition to another term as he had done in 1998, when he easily defeated the Democratic candidate in what was an embarrassingly large defeat for the Democratic Party. Determined not to let that happen again, the Democratic Party came to Fisher. Fisher was not able to run for another term for state treasurer because of the 1994 term-limits law that voters had passed. Because of this, Fisher reluctantly agreed to take on Huckabee. Despite her reluctance to enter the race originally, Fisher ran an incredibly strong and active campaign. She raised over $1 million, and campaigned hard across the state.

She hit Huckabee hard on Education with her REACH proposal. This came at a time when Huckabee was very vulnerable on that issue due to public frustration about poor education funding for rural schools. Other highlights of her campaign included: ethics accountability, prescription drug relief for seniors, Economic Growth and raising the minimum wage, crime, (during a time when Huckabee was being slammed due to questionable pardons, including one that left two women dead in Missouri), and fiscal responsibility.

Polling showed the race slowly narrowing, but Fisher was unable to cut into Huckabee's lead enough to win. Huckabee was also helped by the positive political wave for Republicans that swept through nation that year, though it did little to save incumbent U.S. Senator Tim Hutchinson, from his loss, by a 54 percent to 46 percent margin, to then Attorney General Mark Pryor. In the end, Huckabee won 53 percent to 47 percent.

== 2006 Democratic Attorney General primary ==
In 2006 Fisher signed on as Campaign Chairwoman for State Representative Dustin McDaniel of Jonesboro, who recently won an incredibly close race against North Little Rock City Attorney Paul Suskie for the Democratic nomination for Attorney General. This was thought by many political experts to be the biggest boost to McDaniel's campaign, even bigger than the endorsements of dozens of former presidents of the Arkansas State Bar Association, signifying Fisher's prominence among Democrats in the state.

== Health and death ==
On April 12, 2006, Fisher was hospitalized in Little Rock for an apparent transient ischemic attack, or "mini-stroke". Doctors kept her in the hospital for almost a month and a half to keep her under observation, and perform tests. She was later released after she cleared all the tests, and they noted no further symptoms or complications.

Fisher died at a hospital in Paragould, Arkansas on July 11, 2022, at the age of 80.

== Awards ==
Throughout her long career, Fisher has won many distinguished awards and honors, including:

- Arkansas Democratic Party "Gressie Carnes Award" 1979
- Worthen Bank Professional Women's Advisory Board "Arkansas Professional Women of Distinction Award" 1989
- George C. Douthit "Freedom of Information Award" 1989
- National Association of State Treasurers "Jesse Unruh Award" 1991
- National Association of Democratic Women "Outstanding Elected Democratic Women Holding Public Office Award" 1992
- Arkansas Federation of Democratic Women "Nancy J. Hall Award" 1995
- Arkansas Easter Seal
  - "Arkansan of the Year" 1997
  - "Top 100 Women in Arkansas" 1997, 1998, 1999
- UALR "Women of Arkansas – Agent of Change Award", 2000
- Association of Government Accountants "Financial Manager of the Year" 2000

== Election history ==
2002 General Election

Candidate	Votes	%
Mike Huckabee (R)	427,082	53.01
Jimmie Lou Fisher (D)	378,250	46.95
Mike Huckabee (R) re-elected to 2nd term		

Political offices
Preceded by Jimmie Jones	Auditor of Arkansas; 1979–1981	Succeeded by Julia Jones
Preceded by Nancy Hall	Treasurer of Arkansas; 1981–2003	Succeeded by Gus Wingfield
Party political offices
Preceded by Nancy Hall	Democratic nominee for Treasurer of Arkansas; 1980, 1982, 1984, 1986, 1990, 1994, 1998	Succeeded by Gus Wingfield
Preceded by Bill Bristow	Democratic nominee for Governor of Arkansas; 2002	Succeeded by Mike Beebe
