= Archibald Hamilton Rutherford =

American politician (1811–1888)

- Born: 1811
- Died: December 8, 1888 (aged 76–77)
- Occupation(s): Politician; Journal editor

Archibald Hamilton Rutherford (1811 – December 8, 1888) was a public official, state legislator, and Treasurer of Arkansas.

== Political career ==
In January 1838 he was elected to succeed Speaker of the Arkansas House of Representatives John Wilson who had been expelled from the House after killing representative J. J. Anthony on the House floor. Rutherford was subsequently elected to two additional terms.

In 1858, he and William M. Gouge, state accountants, prepared a report on the State Bank of Arkansas for Arkansas governor Elias Conway.

In 1860 he was Superintendent of the Arkansas State Penitentiary.

He was a state official charged with confiscating land and property during the Civil War. After the war he suffered the economic loss of those he enslaved being freed and property losses to pay taxes. He moved several times.

== Journalist career ==
He was an editor of the Arkansas Democratic Banner. He was put in charge of the Arkansas Banner in Little Rock, a Democratic Party publication promoting its interests in competition with the Whigs. In 1866 he was an editor of the Tri-Weekly News in Little Rock.

== Personal life ==
Rutherford lived in Sebastian County, Arkansas.

Sandford C. Faulkner was a guest at his home in Fort Smith and Rutherford was friends with Edward Payson Washburn. He kept a journal of some of his travels including to parts of Texas.
