= J. Oscar Humphrey =

American politician

Arkansas State Auditor
- In office 1937–1956
- Governor: Carl Edward Bailey; Homer Martin Adkins; Benjamin Travis Laney; Sid McMath; Francis Cherry; Orval Faubus
- Preceded by: Charles E. Parker
- Succeeded by: Carleton Harris

Arkansas State Auditor
- In office 1929–1935
- Governor: Harvey Parnell; Junius Marion Futrell
- Preceded by: J. Carroll Cone
- Succeeded by: Charles E. Parker

Personal details
- Party: Democrat
- Children: 1

J. Oscar Humphrey (January 25, 1886 – March 31, 1956) was a politician from Southwest Arkansas. He served as the Arkansas State Auditor from 1929 to 1935 and 1937–1956, despite having both arms amputated above the elbow due to a sawmill accident as a child.

== Early life ==
Humphrey was raised in DeQueen, Arkansas on his father's farm. When he was six, a farm accident mangled Humphrey's arms, requiring amputation above the elbow. He learned to write by placing a pen between his stub arm and his cheek, and was an avid hunter and fisherman despite his disability. His father died when he was fifteen, leaving Humphrey to provide for his mother and sibling. He completed two years of college while teaching school to pay for tuition.

He taught school for twelve years before winning election as Sevier County Assessor and later Sevier County Treasurer.

== Auditor ==
Humphrey defeated Ralph Thomas of Little Rock and Roy Hand of Yellville in the Democratic primary in August 1928. During the Solid South period, winning the Democratic primary was tantamount to election for almost every office in Arkansas.

The Auditor had a staff of eleven in 1928, ten of which were new appointments by Humphrey.

In his role as Auditor, Humphrey also had an ex-officio board seat on the Confederate Pension Board. Much of Humphrey's first term in office involved devising and implementing a plan to remove undeserving Confederate pensioners from the rolls "plainly not entitled to" benefits following a bill in the 47th Arkansas General Assembly. State Senator Brewer claimed the bill's real purpose was retaliation against Humphrey for failing to reappoint State Senator Walter W. Raney's niece to the Auditor's Office.

In 1929, the Auditor's office was drawn into controversy regarding the Hall Net Income Tax Law. Two members of the Arkansas House of Representatives were listed by Revenue Commissioner David A. Gates, as employees of his department. Arkansas Attorney General Hal L. Norwood issued decisions that the representatives were barred from collecting salary from state government service outside their constitutional office. Though initially seeking to remain neutral, Humphrey later refused to certify the representatives' paychecks, and the issue was sent to the Arkansas Supreme Court.

Act 298 of 1929 required poll taxes to be paid by any adult citizen before obtaining state licenses or state funds, requiring the Auditor's Office to coordinate with county clerks extensively.
