= Nancy Hall =

American politician from Arkansas

Arkansas State Treasurer
- In office January 1963 – January 1981
- Governor: Orval Faubus; Winthrop Rockefeller; Dale Bumpers; David Pryor; Bill Clinton
- Preceded by: Lee Arthur Clayton
- Succeeded by: Jimmie Lou Fisher

Secretary of State of Arkansas
- In office 1961–1963
- Governor: Orval Faubus
- Preceded by: Claris G. “Crip” Hall
- Succeeded by: Kelly Bryant

Personal details
- Born: October 5, 1904 Prescott, Arkansas, U.S.
- Died: January 1, 1991 (aged 86)
- Party: Democratic
- Spouse: Crip Hall (m. 1929)

Nancy Pearl Johnson Hall (October 5, 1904 – January 1, 1991) was the first female Arkansas State Treasurer, serving as a Democrat from 1963 to 1981. Prior to becoming Treasurer, Hall was appointed Secretary of State of Arkansas by Governor Orval Faubus in 1961, after the death of her husband, Crip Hall.

Upon her election in 1962, she became the first woman to be elected to a constitutional office in Arkansas.

== Early life ==
Nancy Pearl Johnson was born on October 5, 1904, in Prescott, Arkansas, to George Sim Johnson and Minnie Bryan Johnson. From the age of 6 she lived in Little Rock, Arkansas, and attended Little Rock Public Schools. Her early career included work as staff for the Arkansas Legislative Council and Arkansas Commissioner of State Lands. Johnson married Claris G. "Crip" Hall on October 5, 1929, and had one daughter. When Crip became Arkansas Secretary of State in 1936 Nancy Hall joined his staff.

== Secretary of State ==
When Crip died in 1961, Governor Orval Faubus appointed Nancy to serve the remained of his term, in a practice sometimes referred to as widow's succession. Upon her appointment, Hall became the first woman to hold constitutional office in Arkansas. As Secretary of State, Hall oversaw maintenance of the Arkansas State Capitol Building, and attracted attention by arguing that a state Easter service on the Capitol grounds should be cancelled rather than desegregated. Arkansas law prohibited appointees to vacant positions from running for the same office in the subsequent election, and Hall instead sought election as State Treasurer.

== State Treasurer ==
Hall was elected State Treasurer in 1962, and became the first woman elected to constitutional office in Arkansas, and the second woman to win a statewide election after Senator Hattie Caraway. As Treasurer, Hall oversaw the automation and computerization of state accounting procedures.

== Retirement ==
Hall did not run for reelection in 1980. After serving for 18 years and 9 terms, Hall left office in 1981 and was succeeded by Jimmie Lou Fisher. Hall died on January 1, 1991, at age 86.

Political offices
Preceded by Claris G. “Crip” Hall	Secretary of State of Arkansas; 1961–1963	Succeeded by Kelly Bryant
Preceded by Lee Arthur Clayton	Arkansas State Treasurer; 1963–1981	Succeeded by Jimmie Lou Fisher
