= Charlie Daniels (politician) =

American Democratic politician from Arkansas (1939–2023)

38th Arkansas State Auditor
- In office January 11, 2011 – January 13, 2015
- Preceded by: Jim Wood
- Succeeded by: Andrea Lea

32nd Arkansas Secretary of State
- In office January 14, 2003 – January 11, 2011
- Preceded by: Sharon Priest
- Succeeded by: Mark Martin

Arkansas Commissioner of State Lands
- In office January 15, 1985 – January 14, 2003
- Preceded by: Winston Bryant
- Succeeded by: Mark Wilcox

Personal details
- Born: Charles L. Daniels; December 7, 1939 Parkers Chapel, Union County, Arkansas, U.S.
- Died: July 9, 2023 (aged 83) Little Rock, Arkansas, U.S.
- Party: Democratic
- Spouse: Patricia Ann Burleson (m. 1958; died 2005)
- Children: 2

Military service
- Allegiance: United States
- Branch/service: United States Air Force

Charles L. "Charlie" Daniels (December 7, 1939 – July 9, 2023) was an American Democratic politician from Arkansas who served in statewide elected office for 30 years. He served as the 38th Arkansas State Auditor from 2011 to 2015, the 32nd Arkansas Secretary of State from 2003 to 2011, and as Arkansas Commissioner of State Lands from 1985 to 2003. Throughout his career, Daniels was known for modernizing state government operations, implementing new technology systems, and maintaining a gregarious personality that made him a popular figure in Arkansas politics.

== Early life and education ==
Charles L. Daniels was born on December 7, 1939, in Parkers Chapel, a community in Union County, Arkansas, to Louie Green Daniels and Ruby Marie Hill Daniels. He grew up in nearby El Dorado, Arkansas.

After graduating from high school, Daniels joined the United States Air Force, serving four years of active duty followed by 15 years in the Air Force Reserves. Upon completing his active military service, he attended Southern Arkansas University in Magnolia, Arkansas, and later the University of Arkansas at Little Rock, though he did not complete a degree at either institution.

Following his education, Daniels worked for 13 years as an electrician with Arkansas Power and Light Company before entering politics.

== Early political career ==
=== School board and Department of Labor ===
Daniels began his political career in 1972 when he was elected to the Parkers Chapel Board of Education, serving until 1974. In 1974, he was appointed Director of the Arkansas Department of Labor by Governor David Pryor. He continued in this role when Bill Clinton succeeded Pryor as governor in 1979, serving until 1980.

=== Private sector interval (1980–1984) ===
After leaving state government in 1980, Daniels served as Director of Government Affairs for the Arkansas Electric Cooperative Corporation from 1980 to 1984, representing rural electric cooperatives before the state legislature and regulatory agencies.

== Commissioner of State Lands (1985–2003) ==
=== Election and tenure ===
In 1984, Daniels ran for Arkansas Commissioner of State Lands, winning the Democratic primary runoff with 54% of the vote and the general election. His campaign benefited partly from name recognition associated with the country music artist Charlie Daniels of The Charlie Daniels Band.

As Commissioner, Daniels was responsible for managing approximately 600,000 acres of state-owned land, overseeing the sale of tax-delinquent properties, administering mineral leases, and maintaining historical land records dating to Arkansas statehood. He was reelected in 1986, 1990, 1994, and 1998, serving 18 years until Arkansas term limits prevented him from seeking reelection in 2002.

=== Administrative accomplishments ===
During his tenure as Land Commissioner, Daniels increased annual revenue from approximately $300,000 to $12 million through enhanced collection of tax-delinquent properties and modernization of office operations. He implemented computerized record-keeping systems to replace paper-based filing and oversaw digitization of historical land records, including original land patents and survey records documenting Arkansas property ownership since territorial days.

== Secretary of State (2003–2011) ==
=== 2002 election ===
In 2002, unable to seek reelection as Land Commissioner due to term limits, Daniels ran for Arkansas Secretary of State. After running unopposed in the Democratic primary, he faced Republican nominee Janet Huckabee, wife of Governor Mike Huckabee, in the general election. The campaign became contentious when Huckabee raised Daniels's past arrests for driving while intoxicated, including one incident involving a state vehicle. Daniels won with 62% of the vote, carrying 74 of Arkansas's 75 counties, and received more votes than any other statewide candidate that year.

=== First term (2003–2007) ===
As Secretary of State, Daniels was responsible for business entity registration, election administration, and administrative rules publication. His office established "Voter View," an online system allowing Arkansas residents to check voter registration status, locate polling places, and track absentee ballot applications, launched in response to Help America Vote Act requirements. His office also created online business filing systems, reducing processing times and administrative costs.

=== Second term (2007–2011) ===
In 2006, Daniels won reelection with more than 60% of the vote, carrying every county in Arkansas. His second term continued technology modernization efforts and included major renovation work at the Arkansas State Capitol building, which he oversaw as chair of the Capitol Arts and Grounds Commission.

== State Auditor (2011–2015) ==
=== 2010 election ===
In 2010, again barred by term limits from seeking reelection as Secretary of State, Daniels ran for Arkansas State Auditor. He faced only Green Party candidate Mary Hughes-Willis in the general election, as no Republican filed for the position. He won every county in Arkansas, receiving 70.65% of the vote.

=== Tenure as Auditor ===
As State Auditor, Daniels oversaw audits of state agencies, county governments, and other public entities, as well as administration of the Arkansas Unclaimed Property Act. He implemented an e-filing system for businesses to report unclaimed property electronically. In fiscal year 2012, the office returned $8.7 million in unclaimed property to Arkansas residents, a 26% increase from the prior year.

=== Retirement ===
In May 2013, Daniels announced he would not seek reelection as State Auditor in 2014, citing a desire to retire after nearly 30 years in statewide office. His term ended on January 13, 2015, and the 2014 race to succeed him was won by Republican Andrea Lea.

== Personal life ==
Daniels married Patricia Ann Burleson in 1958. The couple was married for 46 years until Patricia's death in 2005. They had two children: a daughter, Marsha Harbert, and a son, Chuck Daniels. Daniels was a Baptist and maintained his residence in Bryant, Arkansas, throughout his years in statewide office.

== Death ==
Charlie Daniels died on July 9, 2023, in Little Rock, Arkansas, at the age of 83. His daughter Marsha Harbert confirmed he passed away peacefully following a brief illness, though the specific cause of death was not publicly disclosed.

Following his death, tributes came from Arkansas political figures across party lines. Secretary of State John Thurston described Daniels as having been "always very kind to me and everyone he met," and U.S. Senator Tom Cotton called him "a fixture in the Capitol" and praised his accessibility as a public servant. Memorial services were held through Roller-Ballard Funeral Home in Bryant, Arkansas.

Political offices
Preceded by Winston Bryant	Arkansas Commissioner of State Lands; 1985–2003	Succeeded by Mark Wilcox
Preceded by Sharon Priest	Arkansas Secretary of State; 2003–2011	Succeeded by Mark Martin
Preceded by Jim Wood	Arkansas State Auditor; 2011–2015	Succeeded by Andrea Lea
