= Charles E. Parker =

American judge (1836–1909)

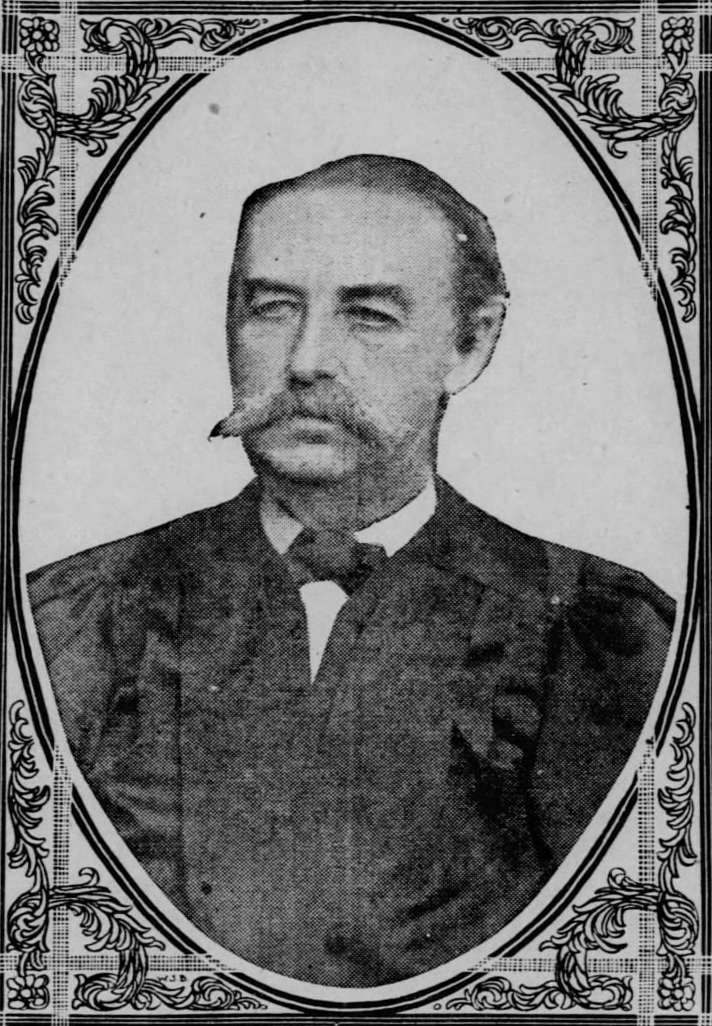
- Parker in a 1909 newspaper
- Born: Charles Edward Parker; August 25, 1836; Owego, New York, U.S.
- Died: March 2, 1909 (aged 72); Owego, New York, U.S.
- Resting place: Evergreen Cemetery
- Occupations: Lawyer; judge; farmer
- Spouse: Mary Farrington (m. 1865)
- Father: John M. Parker

Charles Edward Parker (August 25, 1836 – March 2, 1909) was an American judge from New York. He served as a justice on the New York Supreme Court from 1887 to 1907.

== Early life ==
Charles Edward Parker was born on August 25, 1836, in Owego, New York, to Catherine Ann (née Pumpelly) and John Mason Parker. His father was a member of the U.S. Congress and a New York Supreme Court justice. His grandfather John C. Parker was also a New York Supreme Court justice. He graduated Hobart College in 1857. He read law with his father and was admitted to the bar in 1859.

== Career ==
Parker practiced law for a year in Elmira before returning to Owego. In 1867, he was appointed United States Commissioner for the Northern District of New York. He represented Tioga County in the 1867 New York State Constitutional Convention. He also served as justice of the peace.

In 1871, 1879 and 1880, he was president of the village of Owego. He was elected judge of Tioga County in 1883 and served until January 1, 1888. He was then elected as a justice of the New York Supreme Court on November 8, 1887. He started serving on January 1, 1888. He was appointed presiding justice of the appellate division of the Third Judicial Department by Governor Levi P. Morton in October 8, 1895. He was re-elected in November 1901. He served in his role as justice until January 1, 1907, when he retired due to age limit.

Parker was an organizer, member of the founding board of directors, vice president and later as president of the Owego National Bank.

== Personal life ==
Parker married Mary Farrington, daughter of Thomas Farrington, on June 15, 1865. He was a member of Owego Episcopal Church. His friends called him Charlie. He was known for reading dime novels and had a large farm near Owego.

Parker died on March 2, 1909, at his home in Owego. He was buried in Evergreen Cemetery.

== Awards ==
Parker received an honorary Doctor of Laws from Hobart College in 1902.
