= Treasurer of Arkansas =

Head banker for the State of Arkansas

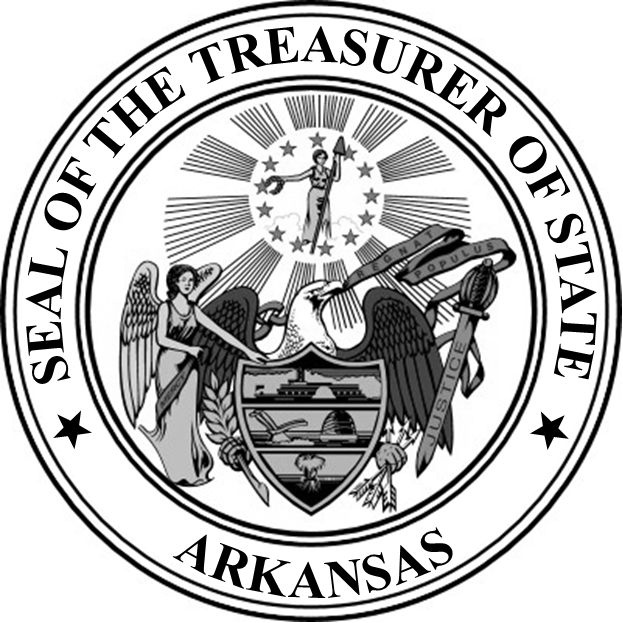

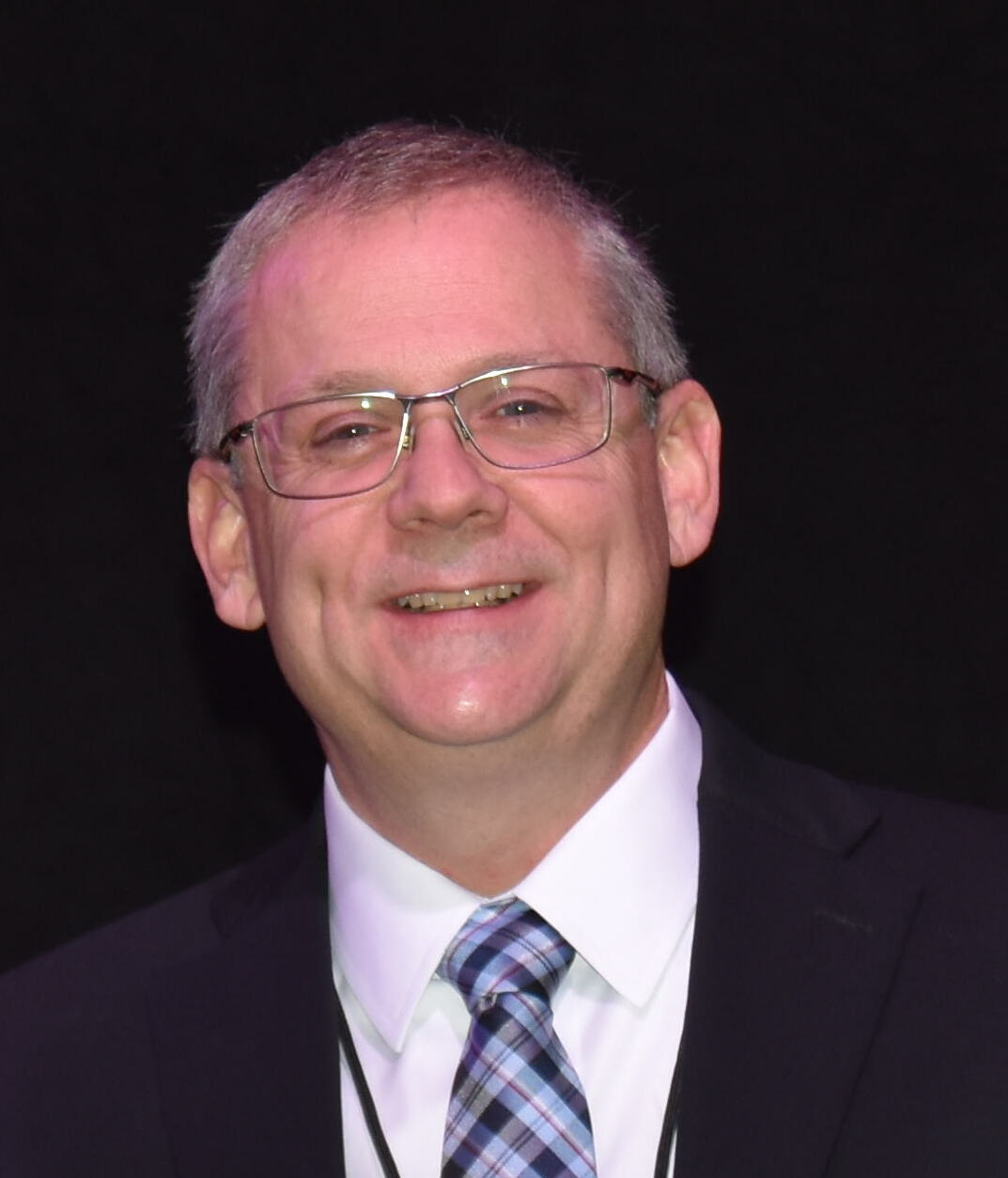
- Incumbent; John Thurston since January 1, 2025
- Formation: August 15, 1819 (207 years ago)
- First holder: James Scull

The treasurer of Arkansas acts as the head banker for the State of Arkansas, handling deposits, withdrawals, redemptions of state warrants, and investments of state funds. The position was created in 1819 when Arkansas became a territory. When Arkansas became a state in 1836, its constitution established the Office of the Treasurer, a position that would be elected by the legislature, and was later changed to a statewide elected post.

The office is currently held by John Thurston, who was elected to the position in a special election in 2024.

== List of treasurers ==
=== Territorial treasurers ===
Name	Term
James Scull	August 5, 1819 – November 12, 1833
Samuel Morton Rutherford	November 12, 1833 – October 1, 1836

=== State treasurers ===
Image	Name	Term
	William E. Woodruff	October 1, 1836 – November 20, 1838
	John Hutt	November 20, 1838 – February 2, 1843
	Jared C. Martin	February 2, 1843 – January 4, 1845
	Samuel Adams	January 4, 1845 – January 2, 1849
	William Adams	January 2, 1849 – January 10, 1849
	Ezekial Edward Nance	1849–1854
	A. H. Rutherford	January 27, 1855 – February 2, 1857
	John H. Crease	February 2, 1857 – February 2, 1859
	John Quindley	February 2, 1859 – December 13, 1860
	James A. Martin	December 13, 1860 – February 2, 1861
	Oliver Basham	February 2, 1861 – April 18, 1864
	E. D. Ayers	April 18, 1864 – October 15, 1866
	L. B. Cunningham	October 15, 1866 – August 19, 1867
	Henry Page	August 19, 1867 to May 23, 1874
	Robert C. Newton	May 23, 1874 – November 12, 1874
	T. J. Churchill	November 12, 1874 – January 1881
	William E. Woodruff, Jr.	January 1881 – January 1891
	R. B. Morrow	January 1891 – January 1895
	Ransom Gulley	January 1895 – January 1899
	T. E. Little	January 1899 – April 1901
	H. C. Tipton	April 1901 – January 1907
	James L. Yates	January 1907 – January 1911
	John Crockett	January 1911 – January 1915
	R. G. McDaniel	January 1915 – January 1919
	Joe Ferguson	January 1919 – January 1925
	Sam Sloan	January 1925 – October 1925
	Dwight H. Blackwood	October 1925 – January 1927
	Ralph Koonce	January 1927 – January 1931
	Roy V. Leonard	January 1931 – January 1935
	Earl Page	January 1935 – January 1945
	J. Vance Clayton	January 1945 – July 1961
	L.A. Clayton	July 1961 – January 1963
	Nancy J. Hall	January 1963 – January 1981
	Jimmie Lou Fisher	January 1981 – January 2003
	Gus Wingfield	January 2003 – January 2007
	Martha Shoffner	January 2007 – May 2013
	Charles Robinson	May 2013 – January 2015
	Dennis Milligan	January 2015 – January 2023
	Mark Lowery	January 2023 – July 2023
	Larry Walther	August 2023 – January 2025
	John Thurston	January 2025 – present
