= Walter Rose =

Walter Rose may refer to:

- Walter W. Rose (fl. 1900s–1940s), American politician and real estate developer
- Walter Rose (footballer) (1912–1989), German international footballer
- Tam Rose (Walter Sumner Rose, 1888–1961), American football player and coach
- Wally Rose (1913–1997), American jazz and ragtime pianist

== See also ==
- Rose (surname)
- Walter Rosa (1919–2017), Portuguese politician, engineer, manager and diplomat
