= John Dodington (bass) =

Canadian operatic bass

John Dodington (born 3 July 1945) is a Canadian operatic bass. Born in Toronto, he studied singing at The Royal Conservatory of Music with George Lambert from 1965 to 1971. He then studied singing at the University of Toronto under Louis Quilico where he earned a Bachelor of Music degree in 1972. From 1972 to 1975 he studied singing with Otakar Kraus in London. In 1974 he made his professional opera debut as the First Apprentice in Alban Berg's Wozzeck at the Royal Opera, London. In 1976 he returned to Canada to join the Vancouver Opera. Since then he has sung both leading and secondary roles in nearly 20 productions with the Canadian Opera Company, and has made appearances with Calgary Opera, Edmonton Opera, Manitoba Opera, Opéra de Montréal, Opera Hamilton, and Pacific Opera Victoria among others. He has also appeared as a soloist with the Festival Singers of Canada, the Kingston Symphony, the National Arts Centre Orchestra, the Thunder Bay Symphony Orchestra, the Toronto Philharmonic Orchestra, the Vancouver Cantata Singers, the Vancouver Symphony Orchestra, and the Winnipeg Symphony Orchestra among others.
