= Joel Ivany =

Canadian stage director and artistic director

- Born: Penticton, British Columbia
- Education: University of Western Ontario; University of Toronto
- Occupation: Stage director
- Years active: 2011–present
- Organization(s): Against the Grain Theatre, Edmonton Opera, Banff Centre for Arts and Creativity
- Notable credit(s): Messiah, Don Giovanni, and Così fan tutte
- Spouse: Miriam Khalil
- Children: Two children
- Website: joelivany.com

Joel Ivany is a Canadian opera director and artistic director of Edmonton Opera. He is the founder and former artistic director of Against the Grain Theatre in Toronto, Ontario.

He is known for directing adaptations of the Messiah, Don Giovanni, and Così fan tutte. Ivany was the program director for opera at the Banff Centre from 2014 to 2025 (12 seasons).

== Early life and education ==
Joel Ivany holds a Bachelor of Music degree from the University of Western Ontario and an Artist Diploma in Opera Directing from the University of Toronto. In 2011, Ivany won third prize in the sixth European Opera Directing Prize for a concept for Bellini's I Capuleti e i Montecchi, developed with Canadian designers Camellia Koo and Jason Hand.

Following workshops at Banff in 2010, he directed the premiere of the chamber opera Marilyn Forever by Gavin Bryars with the Aventa Ensemble in Victoria British Columbia, in 2013, followed by performances at the Adelaide Festival, Australia, in 2015.

== Career ==
He made his concert directorial debut with the Toronto Symphony Orchestra in a staged presentation of Requiem (Mozart) and his Canadian Opera Company directing debut with Carmen, both in 2016.

As founder and artistic director of Against the Grain Theatre (AtG), Ivany developed adaptations of opera for unconventional venues and contemporary settings. These productions included adaptations of La bohème in a bar, Pelléas et Mélisande in an outdoor courtyard, Le nozze di Figaro in a wedding venue, retitled Figaro's Wedding, Così fan tutte retitled A Little Too Cozy and set as a reality television dating competition in a CBC television studio in Toronto, an outdoor reinterpretation of Mozart's Don Giovanni titled Uncle John, a staged and choreographed Messiah, and The Turn of the Screw in a converted attic.

His directing credits includeThe Tales of Hoffmann, Die Fledermaus and Don Giovanni with Edmonton Opera, Macbeth , and Dead Man Walking for Minnesota Opera and Carmen for Vancouver Opera.

In Canada he has directed for the Canadian Opera Company, Vancouver Opera, Edmonton Opera, Against the Grain Theatre, the University of Toronto, Wilfrid Laurier University, Music Niagara, Opera Nuova, the University of Western Ontario, The Royal Conservatory of Music, and the Banff Centre.

Internationally he has worked with Washington National Opera, Minnesota Opera, The Norwegian National Opera, Bard Summerscape, Deutsche Oper Berlin, Wexford Festival, the Adelaide Festival, Opera Holland Park, and Lyric Opera Studio Weimar.

Ivany co-directed Against the Grain Theatre's Messiah/Complex, which was covered in the New York Times.

In November 2021, Ivany was appointed artistic director of Edmonton Opera.

== Awards and recognition ==
Ivany has written four original adaptations of opera librettos including La bohème, Don Giovanni, Le nozze di Figaro and Così fan tutte. His production of Figaro's Wedding garnered seven Dora Mavor Moore Award nominations including Outstanding Production, Outstanding Direction, and a win for Dora Mavor Moore Award for Outstanding New Musical/Opera in 2014.

In 2015 his production of Uncle John received three Dora Mavor Moore Award nominations.

In 2018 he was inducted into the Faculty of Music Alumni Wall of Fame at Western University

In 2018 his co-production of Orphée^{+} received nine Dora Mavor Moore Award nominations and won five awards including Outstanding Production.

In 2020 he was named a Canadian Arts Hero in the Globe and Mail.

== Personal life ==
Ivany in Edmonton with his wife, soprano Miriam Khalil and their two sons.
