= Jean Bonhomme =

Canadian tenor (1937–1986)

- Bonhomme in the 1970s
- Born: February 14, 1937; Ottawa, Ontario, Canada
- Died: June 19, 1986 (aged 49); Ottawa, Ontario, Canada
- Occupation: Operatic tenor
- Organizations: Royal Opera House

Jean Robert Gérard Joseph Bonhomme (February 14, 1937 – June 19, 1986) was a Canadian tenor who had an active international performance career during the 1960s and 1970s. According to Karl-Josef Kutsch and Leo Riemens, Bonhomme was a spinto tenor who excelled in the role of Don José in Bizet's Carmen and in operas by Giacomo Puccini and Giuseppe Verdi.

Before his training as a singer, Bonhomme worked as a janitor while studying pre-medicine and law at the University of Ottawa. For seven years he played the centre position on the Ottawa Gee-Gees football team. His interest in singing began at his Catholic church where he was often called upon to sing at weddings as a soloist. Without ever studying or learning to read music he won a classical vocal competition at the Ottawa Music Festival in 1960. After this, he trained for an opera career in private lessons with retired Metropolitan Opera tenor Raoul Jobin and at The Royal Conservatory of Music with George Lambert. He was a leading tenor at the Royal Opera House in London from 1965 through 1976. He also appeared in principal roles as a guest artist in theaters throughout Europe, North America, and in South Africa. After retiring from the stage in 1976 he worked as a police officer with the Correctional Service of Canada until his death in 1986.

== Early life and education ==
The son of J. Roland Bonhomme and his wife Aline Boileau, Jean Robert Gérard Joseph Bonhomme was born in Ottawa, Ontario, on February 14, 1937. His father was a baby food salesman. At the age of 16 he began studying at the University of Ottawa (UO). There he played the centre position on the Ottawa Gee-Gees Canadian football team for seven years. He supported himself by working as a janitor at a nearby school during this time. In 1956 he portrayed a soldier in UO's production of Dryden's Troilus and Cressida. He graduated from the UO in 1957 with a Bachelor of Arts degree in pre-medicine. He then attended UO's law school but dropped out after failing in his second year twice, ultimately dropping out in 1961. While in college he married Jean Wigmore.

Bonhomme began singing at a Catholic church while at UO and was frequently a soloist at weddings without ever having singing training. In 1960 he entered the classical vocal competition at the Ottawa Music Festival, winning the dramatic tenor category and competing in the finals. He caught the attention of retired Metropolitan Opera tenor Raoul Jobin, who immediately recognized that Bonhomme could have a career in opera if properly trained. He studied singing privately with Jobin in Montreal from 1961 to 1964, and concurrently trained under baritone George Lambert at The Royal Conservatory of Music (RCM) from 1962 to 1964.

Bonhomme studied at the RCM on a full scholarship provided by the Beta Sigma Phi sorority. While a student there he portrayed the title role in the RCM's student production of Milhaud's Le Pauvre Matelot in April 1964. That same year he won first prize at the CBC Talent Festival. In November 1963 he won the Richard Tucker Talent Search and March 1964 he won first prize at the music competition held at the Kiwanis Music Festival in Toronto. He later studied singing with Maria Carpi in Geneva, Switzerland, and with Luigi Ricci in Rome in 1965–1966.

== Career ==
=== 1960s ===
On March 22, 1964, Bonhomme made his recital debut at the National Gallery of Canada with John Coveart as his accompanist, performing French chansons by a variety of composers and opera arias by Giacomo Puccini, Jules Massenet, Christoph Willibald Gluck, and George Friedrich Handel. He made his professional opera debut at the Avon Theatre on August 4, 1964, as Don Basilio in the Stratford Festival's (SF) production of Mozart's The Marriage of Figaro with Jan Rubeš as Figaro, Laurel Hurley as Susanna, Ilona Kombrink as the Countess, and Cornelis Opthof as the Count. He was also the tenor soloist in the SF's presentation of J. S. Bach's Magnificat later that month. He returned to the SF in 1965 to portray Fatty the Bookkeeper in the North American premiere of Weill's Rise and Fall of the City of Mahagonny.

In 1964-1965 Bonhomme was committed to the Sadler's Wells Opera (SWO) where he made his debut as Uldino in Verdi's Attila. He subsequently had tremendous success with the SWO as John Styx in Offenbach's Orpheus in the Underworld. He also performed the roles of Don Basilio and Pinkerton in Puccini's Madama Butterfly with the SWO. In September 1965 he performed duets from La bohème with soprano Lilian Sukis and the Toronto Symphony Orchestra in a concert celebrating the grand opening of the newly built Toronto City Hall. He performed the role of Rodolfo in the opera for his debut with the Canadian Opera Company (COC) on September 23, 1965. He returned to the COC in the title role of Gounod's Faust in 1966.

Bonhomme was a resident tenor at the Royal Opera House (ROH) from 1965 to 1969. In 1966 he performed the role of Pong in Puccini's Turandot at the ROH with Charles Mackerras conducting and Anita Välkki in the title role. The following month he portrayed his first leading tenor role at the ROH, Rodolfo in La bohème, with Joan Carlyle as Mimì. Other leading roles he performed with the company in the 1960s included Aeneas in Les Troyens, Bénédict in Béatrice et Bénédict, both by Berlioz, Don Jose in Bizet's Carmen, Pinkerton, and Pylade in Gluck's Iphigénie en Tauride.

In February 1967 he was the tenor soloist in Roméo et Juliette by Berlioz with the BBC Symphony Orchestra under conductor Gary Bertini at Royal Festival Hall. He sang this work again with this orchestra under Colin Davis the following December with Josephine Veasey as his fellow soloist. In March 1967 he was the tenor soloist in Mozart's Requiem with the Los Angeles Philharmonic led by Zubin Mehta at the Dorothy Chandler Pavilion. In 1969 he made his debut at the Paris Opera as Aeneas in Les Troyens. That same year he performed the role of Henri in a concert version of Verdi's Les vêpres siciliennes at Royal Albert Hall with Mario Rossi conducting the BBC Concert Orchestra. This concert was recorded and later released on disc on the Opera Rara label in 2004.

Bonhomme also appeared as a guest artist in lead roles at the Opéra de Monte-Carlo, the Opéra de Marseille, the Hungarian State Opera, and the Dutch National Opera in the late 1960s.

=== 1970s ===
While Bonhomme predominantly worked in North America during the 1970s, he remained active as a lead tenor at the ROH until his retirement. He appeared there as Rodolfo in 1970 and as Don José in 1970–1971 and again in 1974, performing in this latter year with Kiri Te Kanawa as Micaëla and Viorica Cortez in the title role. He appeared as Cavaradossi in Puccini's Tosca at the ROH in 1972 and again in 1973. His final performance at the ROH was in 1976.

Bonhomme returned to the COC in 1970 as Don José and as Faust in 1974. He also performed Don José for his debuts at the Houston Grand Opera in 1971, the Pittsburgh Opera in 1972, and the Connecticut Opera in 1973. He also starred in a production of Carmen in South Africa in 1972. In July 1971 he made his debut at the Santa Fe Opera (SFO) in the title role of Verdi's Don Carlos, and also performed the role of Erik in Wagner's Der fliegende Holländer in August 1971. He performed twice with the Opéra de Québec in the 1970s, portraying Luigi in Il tabarro in 1971 and Turiddu in Cavalleria rusticana in 1973. In autumn of 1973 he performed at the inaugural Algoma Fall Festival in a concert of Puccini and Verdi opera duets with Maria Pellegrini.

In 1974 he alternated with Tom Swift in the title role of Verdi's Don Carlos at the English National Opera. In 1975 he portrayed John the Baptist in the New Orleans Opera's production of Massenet's Hérodiade.

In 1976 he was tenor soloist in Beethoven's Symphony No. 9 with the Hamilton Philharmonic Orchestra and the Toronto Mendelssohn Choir. That same year he portrayed Canio in Leoncavallo's Pagliacci with the Southern Alberta Opera Association, a company he had previously appeared with as Faust in 1975.

== Later life and death ==
After retiring from the stage in 1976, Bonhomme worked as a police officer with the Correctional Service of Canada. He and his wife had two daughters, Stephanie and Julie. He died on June 19, 1986, in Ottawa at the age of 49.
