= Mary Louisa Willard =

American forensic scientist (1898–1993)

- Born: May 19, 1898; State College, Pennsylvania, US
- Died: April 17, 1993 (aged 94)
- Education: Pennsylvania State University; Cornell University
- Scientific career
- Fields: Microscopy; Forensic science
- Workplaces: Pennsylvania State University

External videos
- “Chemistry Professor and Crime Buster: The Remarkable Life of Mary Louisa Willard”, Lost Women of Science.

Mary Louisa Willard (May 19, 1898 – April 17, 1993) was an American chemist and forensic scientist internationally recognized for both her expertise in chemical microscopy and forensic science. Serving as a professor at Pennsylvania State University from 1921 until her retirement in 1964, she played a pivotal role in assisting law enforcement agencies globally with criminal investigations, earning her such monikers as "Lady Sherlock."

== Early life and education ==
Mary Louisa Willard was born May 19, 1898, at Moffat Cottage on the Pennsylvania State University (Penn State) campus in State College, Pennsylvania, to Joseph Moody Willard and Henrietta Nunn. Her father was a mathematics professor at Penn State and is the namesake of the Willard Building on campus. After graduating from high school, she initially enrolled at Mount Holyoke College. However, she returned home when her father fell ill with anemia, and subsequently decided to continue her education at Penn State.

In 1921, she became one of three women to graduate from Penn State with a Bachelor of Science in chemistry, and that same year, she joined the chemistry department as an assistant. In 1923, when she completed her master's degree in organic chemistry, she was promoted to instructor. She took time off to pursue doctoral studies at Cornell University, where she earned her Ph.D. in organic chemistry in 1927 under the mentorship of William Ridgely Orndorff. Her doctoral thesis focused on the condensation reactions of ortho-hydroxy aromatic aldehydes with cyclic ketones, and was published in 1929 in the "Journal of American Chemical Society."

== Career and research ==
After completing her Ph.D., Willard returned to Penn State in 1927 as an assistant professor. She was one of only four women teaching in the chemistry and chemical agriculture departments at the time. She was promoted to full professor in 1938 and served on the faculty until her retirement in 1964. She was well known for her microscopy research and for her dedication to student mentorship.

Willard's expertise in micro-chemical analysis led her to become involved in forensic work, which began in 1930, when a Scranton judge approached her to examine a whiskey sample confiscated during a prohibition raid. Soon after, she was asked to analyze paint found on a robbery suspect's clothing in Wilkes-Barre and compare it to paint at the crime scene. These early successes launched her reputation in forensic chemistry, and she quickly became a go-to expert for cases across Pennsylvania and beyond.

Over the ensuing decades, she aided local and international law enforcement agencies in cases involving arson, forgery, poisonings, and homicides, often providing her services pro bono. She employed a range of, what was then, advanced techniques in her forensic investigations, including ultraviolet and infrared spectroscopy, gas chromatography, mass spectrometry, and nuclear magnetic resonance. While she did not invent these techniques or instruments, Willard was among the first to apply them systematically to criminal investigations, laying the foundation for modern forensic science. Her consulting work garnered international recognition, leading to collaborations with organizations such as Interpol, Scotland Yard, and the Sûreté.

== Notable contributions and legacy ==
Willard published more than 40 scientific articles on chemistry and criminology as well as laboratory manuals on chemical microscopy. Among her publications was a short monograph on Pioneer Women in Chemistry. In 1942, she was appointed Assistant Editor of the journal Mikrochemie (Mikrochemica Acta), a position she held for many years. She gave numerous public talks throughout her career–not only on chemistry and forensic science, but also on women in science, and topics such as hair and fur analysis.

== Honors and awards ==
She was a member of the American Chemical Society, the American Institute of Chemists, and the American Association for the Advancement of Science. She also held memberships in the American Crystallographic Association, American Microscopical Society, American Microchemical Society, and the American Forensic Society.

Willard received many honors during her life:

- 1946 – First woman to chair the analytical and microchemistry division of the American Chemical Society
- 1955 – Second woman to receive the Scroll of Honor from the Pennsylvania Chapter of the American Institute of Chemists
- 1957 – Honorary member of the Fraternal Order of Police
- 1959 – First individual recognized by Penn State for "excellence in teaching"
- 1965 – Penn State's Woman of the Year
- 1968 - Beta Sigma Phi’s Woman of the Year
- 1969 - Received an honorary doctorate of Science from Western College for Women
- 1971 – First woman admitted to membership in Alpha Chi Sigma, the professional chemistry fraternity
- 1992 - State College High School’s Distinguished Alumni Award

She was a founding member of the IOTA chapter of Delta Kappa Gamma (1947), and held memberships in Sigma Delta Epsilon, Sigma Xi, Phi Kappa Phi, Iota Sigma Pi, and Beta Sigma Phi. Willard also belonged to numerous academic and civic organizations including American Association of University Professors, the American Association of University Women, Altrusa Club, the Business and Professional Women's Club, Daughters of American Colonists, and the Daughters of the American Revolution.

In 2009, the Mary Willard Trustee Scholarship was established at Penn State's Eberly College of Science to support students with financial need, with preference given to forensic science majors. In 2021, the Nu Chapter Alumni of Alpha Chi Sigma established the Mary L. Willard Scholarship Fund in the Eberly College of Science.

== Personal life ==
Beyond her professional endeavors, Willard was known for her vibrant personality. She was often seen driving her pink Cadillac around State College and was famous for hosting annual birthday parties for her cocker spaniels, inviting neighborhood children to join the celebrations. She also tended to her rose garden, where she cultivated 96 species of roses. Willard never married and did not have children. She died on April 17, 1993, and was survived by nephews, grandnieces, and grandnephews. Her papers are located in the University Archives of Pennsylvania State University.

== Selected publications ==
Blank, E. W., & Willard, M. L. (1932). Micromolecular-Weight Determination by Vapor-Density Methods. Journal of Chemical Education, 9, 1819–1826.

Blank, E. W., & Willard, M. L. (1933). Micro-density Determination of Solids and Liquids. Journal of Chemical Education, 10, 109–112.

Braddock, L. I., & Willad, M. L. (1953). The 2, 4 Dinitrophenyl Hydrazones of the Phenyl Alkyl Ketones, Their Preparation and Optical Properties. Mikrochemie and Mikrochimia Acta, 40, 200.

Braddock, L. I., & Willard, M. L. (1951a). 2, 4 Dinitrophenyl Hydrazones of C6 Ketones. Journal of the American Chemical Society.

Braddock, L. I., & Willard, M. L. (1951b). The 2,4-Dinitrophenylhydrazones of the Alkyl Phenyl Ketones. Journal of the American Chemical Society, 73(5866).

Braddock, L. I., & Willard, M. L. (1952). The Separation and Identification of the 2, 4 Dinitrophenyl Hydrazones. Analytical Chemistry.

Braddock, L. I., & Willard, M. L. (1953). The Structure of the 2, 4 Dinitrophenyl Hydrazones. Journal of Organic Chemistry, 18(3), 313.

Braddock, L. I., Garlow, K. Y., Grim, L. I., Kirkpatrick, A. F., Pease, S. W., Pollard, A. J., Price, E. F., Reissman, T. L., Rose, H. A., & Willard, M. L. (1953). Formation, Separation and Identification of 2, 4 Dinitrophenyl Hydrazones. Analytical Chemistry, 25(2), 301.

Campbell, B., & Willard, M. L. (1938). Optical Studies of Stovaine and Three Related Compounds. Zeitschrift Für Kristallographie, 100, 111–119.

Detwiler, E. B., & Willard, M. L. (1932). Some Metal Salts of B-naphthylamine and its Hydrochloride. Mikrochemie, 12, 261–263.

Higgins, R. W., Francis, H., & Willard, M. L. (1951). Iodophthlates and Their Optical Properties. The Journal of Organic Chemistry.

Orndorff, W. R., & Willard, M. L. (1929). Hydroxyhydroquinonesulfonephthalein, 2, 4, 5 - Trihydroxybenzoylbenzeneo-Sulfonic Acid (the Intermediate Acid) and Some of its Derivatives. Journal of the American Chemical Society, 51, 1466–1474.

Pollard, A. J., Luster, B., & Willard, M. L. (1954). Photomicrography, A Laboratory Outline. Edwards Bros.

Pollard, A. S., & Willard, M. L. (1952). The Calibration of a Micrometer Byepiece for the Determination of 2E. Mikrochemie and Mikrochimica Acta, 39, 192.

Sandrus, H. J., & Willard, M. L. (1932). Preliminary Paper on the Microchemical Identification of Caffeine. Mikrochemie, 12, 137–142.

Shaner, M. L., & Willard, M. L. (1936a). Optical Crystallographic Data for Some Salts of the Cinchona Alkaloids. Journal of the American Chemical Society, 58, 1977.

Shaner, M. L., & Willard, M. L. (1936b). Some Tests for the Identification of the Alkaloid Yohimbine. Mikrochemie, 19, 222–226.

Surmantis, J. D., & Willard, M. L. (1937). Microscopic Tests for Amino Acids. Mikrochemie, 21, 167–170.

Wallace, E. H., & Willard, M. L. (1931). A Practical Hot Stage for the Microscope. Journal of Chemical Education, 8, 706–711.

Willard, M L, & Berry, P. G. (1923). A History of Dyes. The Journal of Home Economics, 15(3).

Willard, M L, & Clark, A. R. (1945). Chromium Pyridine and Quinoline Complexes. Zeitschrift Für Kristallographie, 106, 300.

Willard, M L, & Crabtree, D. E. (1936). Semimicro Cottrell Boiling-Point Apparatus. Industrial & Engineering Chemistry, 8, 79–80.

Willard, M L, & Jones, M. Z. (1940). Optical Properties of Phenylthiourea Derivatives. Journal of the American Chemical Society, 62, 2876–2877.

Willard, M L, & Maresh, C. (1940a). Optical Constants for Bensamide and its Homologues. Journal of the American Chemical Society, 62, 1253–1257.

Willard, M L, & Maresh, C. (1940b). Optical Constants of Benzamide, its Homologs, and Some Aliphatic Amides. Journal of the American Chemical Society, 62(1253), 1253–1257.

Willard, M L, & Orinick, M. T. (1936). Comparative Microscopic Tests of Anabasine and Related Compounds. Mikrochemie, 21.

Willard, M L. (1923a). Notes on the Permanence of Sodium Thiosulfate Solutions. Textile Colorist, 45, 781–782.

Willard, M L. (1923b). The Chemistry of the Raisin. American Food Journal, 18, 540–542.

Willard, M L. (1924a). Notes on the Rate of Diazotization of Amines. Textile Colorist, 46, 164–165.

Willard, M L. (1924b). Notes on the Rate of Diazotization of Various Amines. Textile Colorist, 46, 22–23.

Willard, M L. (1924c). Preparation of H-Acid. Color Trade Journal, 15, 40–42.

Willard, M L. (1954a). Optical Properties of Procaine Hydrochloride. Analytical Chemistry.

Willard, M L. (1954b). Pleochroism of 2, 4 Dinitrophenyl Hydrazones as Related to Structure. Analytical Chemistry.

Willard, Mary L., Chamot, E. M., & Mason, C. W. (1952). Chemical Microscopy, A Laboratory Outline. Edwards Bros.

Yoder, B. M., & Willard, M. L. (1935). Shrinkage of Cotton. Textile Colorist, 57, 772–775.

Yorks, K. P., & Willard, M. L. (1936). Phthalic Acid as a Reagent for the Optical Identification of Some Metals and Alkaloids. Mikrochemie, 19, 227–229.

Zerbey, M. E., Orinick, M. T., & Willard, M. L. (1937). Comparative Tests of Anabasine and its Related Compounds, its Purification and Some Physical Constants. Mikrochemie, 21, 171–177.

Zerfoss, S., & Willard, M. L. (1936). Estimation of Cuprous Oxide, Cupric Oxide and Copper in Mixtures. A Microscopical Method. Industrial & Engineering Chemistry, 303.
