= Jean Letourneau =

Jean Letourneau may refer to:

- Jean Létourneau (musician) (1921–2018), Canadian tenor, french horn player, conductor, opera director, and music educator
- Jean Letourneau (politician) (1907–1986), French politician and lawyer
- Jean-Charles Létourneau (1775–1838), Canadian notary and politician
