= 2002 Arkansas Secretary of State election =

- November 5, 2002

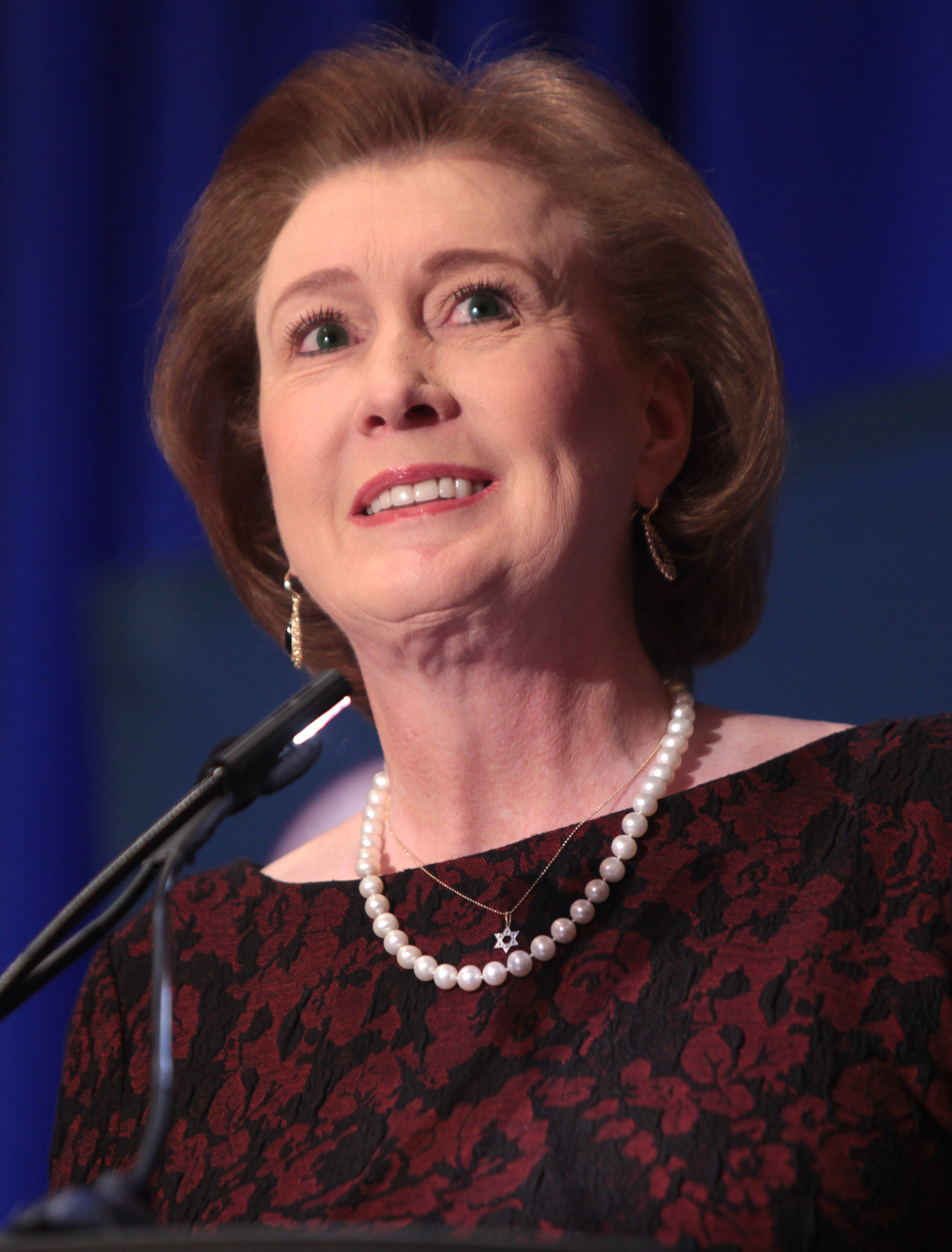
Candidate	Charlie Daniels	Janet Huckabee
Party	Democratic	Republican
Popular vote	492,621	300,293
Percentage	62.13%	37.87%
- County results Daniels: 50–60% 60–70% 70–80% Huckabee: 50–60%
Secretary of State before election
Sharon Priest
Democratic
Elected Secretary of State
Charlie Daniels
Democratic

The 2002 Arkansas Secretary of State election was held on November 5, 2002 to elect the Secretary of State of Arkansas. Democratic incumbent Sharon Priest was term-limited and ineligible to serve a fourth term. Democratic nominee and Arkansas Commissioner of State Lands Charlie Daniels won the election in a landslide, defeating Republican nominee and First Lady of Arkansas Janet Huckabee by twenty-four percentage points and winning every county in the state except for Benton.

== General election ==
=== Candidates ===
- Charlie Daniels, Arkansas Commissioner of State Lands (1985–2003) (Democratic)
- Janet Huckabee, First Lady of Arkansas (1996–2007) (Republican)

=== Results ===
2002 Arkansas Secretary of State election results
Party	Candidate	Votes	%	±%
Democratic	Charlie Daniels	492,621	62.13%	−7.10%
Republican	Janet Huckabee	300,293	37.87%	+7.10%
Total votes		792,914	100.00%	
Democratic hold				
