= Psalm 90 =

Biblical psalm

- "Lord, thou hast been our dwelling place in all generations"
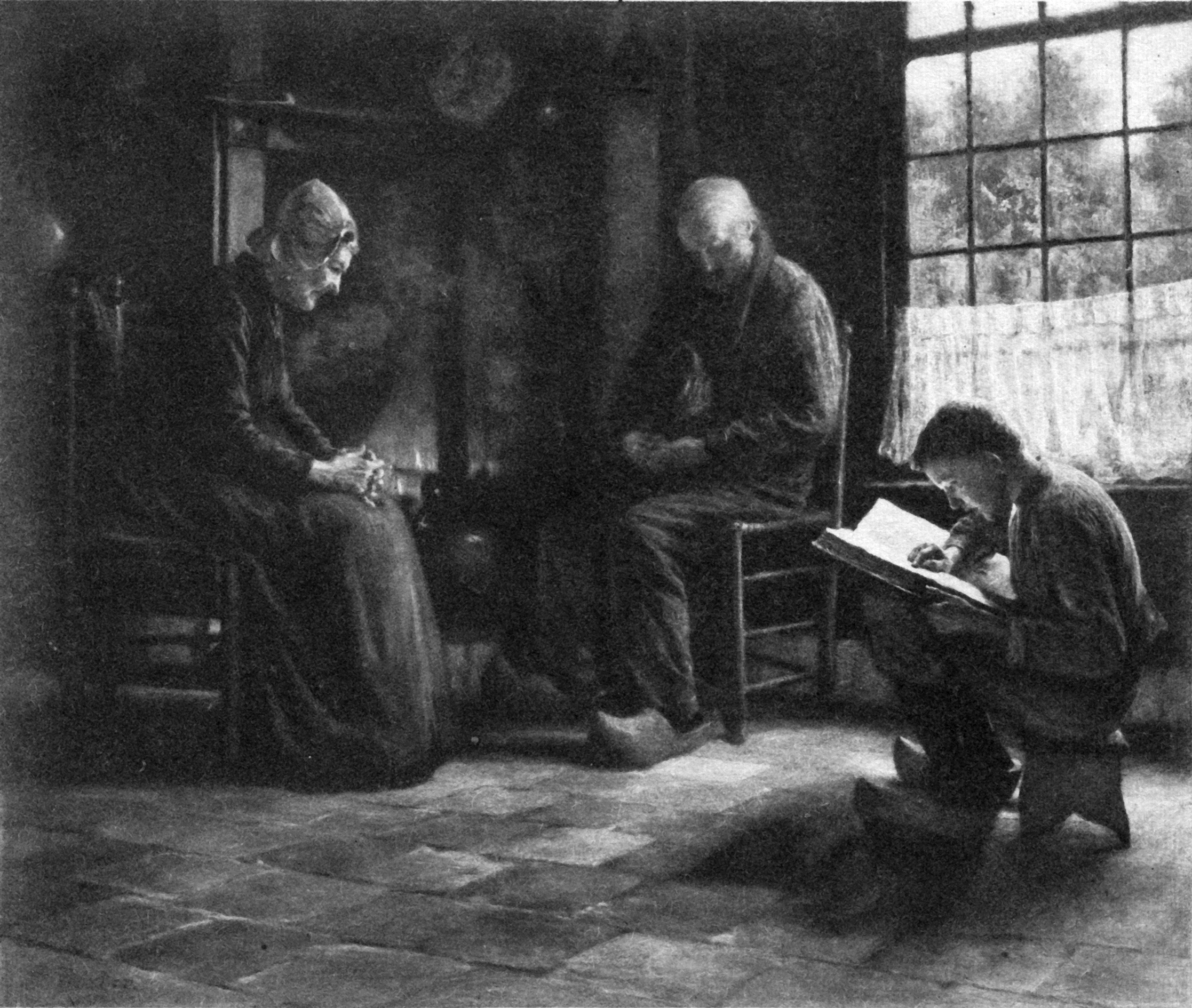
- Painting "Psalm 90. V. 10." (Psalm 90:10) by Ludwig Noster (1909)
- Other name: Psalm 89; "Domine refugium tu factus es nobis in generatione et generatione"
- Text: attributed to Moses
- Language: Hebrew (original)

Psalm 90
- ← Psalm 89 Psalm 91 →
- Book: Book of Psalms
- Hebrew Bible part: Ketuvim
- Order in the Hebrew part: 1
- Category: Sifrei Emet
- Christian Bible part: Old Testament
- Order in the Christian part: 19

Psalm 90 is the 90th psalm of the Book of Psalms, beginning in English in the King James Version: "Lord, thou hast been our dwelling place in all generations". In the slightly different numbering system used in the Greek Septuagint and Latin Vulgate translations of the Bible, this psalm is Psalm 89. In Latin, it is known as "Domine refugium tu factus es nobis in generatione et generatione". It is the opening psalm of Book 4 of the psalms. Uniquely among the Psalms, it is attributed to Moses. It is well known for its reference in verse 10 to human life expectancy being 70 or 80 ("threescore years and ten", or "if by reason of strength ... fourscore years", in the King James Version): it is believed that this verse was the influence for the opening words of Abraham Lincoln's Gettysburg Address.

The psalm forms a regular part of Jewish, Catholic liturgies. It has been set to music, for example by Baroque composers Heinrich Schütz in German. Charles Ives completed a choral setting in 1924.

== Textual witnesses ==
Some early manuscripts containing the text of this chapter in Hebrew are of the Masoretic Text tradition, which includes the Aleppo Codex (10th century), and Codex Leningradensis (1008).

The extant manuscript of Aq^{Taylor}, a translation into Koine Greek made in c. 130 CE, contains verse 17.

== Authorship and date ==
By its header ("A Prayer of Moses, the man of God") this psalm is attributed to Moses. Theologian Albert Barnes notes "its marked unlikeness to the Psalms of David". Commentator C S Rodd suggests it was written later than Moses' era, but even from a biblical literalist perspective one writer warns against assuming with any certainty that this is the oldest psalm, because some psalms are anonymous and so "we don't know who wrote them or when".

The title "the man of God" is given to Moses in Deuteronomy 33:1 in the introduction to the Blessing of Moses. The term also appears in Joshua 14:6 and Ezra 3:2 as a title especially appropriate to him, denoting that he was faithful to God and a man approved by God.

== Uses ==
=== New Testament ===
In the New Testament, verse 4 is quoted in 2 Peter 3:8.

=== Judaism ===
- Psalm 90 is recited during the Pesukei Dezimra during Shabbat, Yom Tov, and - in many communities - on Hoshana Rabbah.
- It is recited on Shabbat Nachamu (the Shabbat after Tisha B'Av) in some traditions.
- Verse 17 is recited following Motzei Shabbat Maariv and the first paragraph of the Shema during bedtime prayers.
- Psalm 90 is one of the ten psalms of the Tikkun HaKlali of Rebbe Nachman of Breslov.

=== Christianity ===
In the Divine Office of the Roman Catholic Church, Psalm 90 is appointed to be read at Lauds (Morning Prayer) on the Monday of the fourth week of the month.

In the Church of England's Book of Common Prayer, this psalm is appointed to be read on the morning of the 18th day of the month.

=== Iceland ===
Lofsöngur, the national anthem of Iceland, written by Lutheran clergyman and poet Matthías Jochumsson, was based on Psalm 90.

== Musical settings ==
The hymn "Our God, Our Help in Ages Past" is a lyrical version of Psalm 90 written by Isaac Watts.

Heinrich Schütz set the psalm in a metred version in German as part of the Becker Psalter, first published in 1628, "Herr Gott Vater im höchsten Thron", SWV 188.

Ralph Vaughan Williams wrote Lord, thou hast been our refuge, a motet for choir, semi-choir and orchestra (or organ) based on the psalm in 1921. Charles Ives composed a choral setting of the psalm in English, Psalm 90, in 1923/24. Frederic Lord wrote a setting for baritone, choir and orchestra. Herbert Blendinger set verses 1-4 in German, "Herr, du bist unsere Zuflucht für und für", as Psalmgebet, a solo cantata for soprano, trumpet and organ, Op. 82, in 2000.

== Text ==
The following table shows the Hebrew text of the Psalm with vowels, alongside the Koine Greek text in the Septuagint and the English translation from the King James Version. Note that the meaning can slightly differ between these versions, as the Septuagint and the Masoretic Text come from different textual traditions. (Note: A 1917 translation directly from Hebrew to English by the Jewish Publication Society can be found here or here, and an 1844 translation directly from the Septuagint by L. C. L. Brenton can be found here. Both translations are in the public domain.) In the Septuagint, this psalm is numbered Psalm 89.

#	Hebrew	English	Greek
1	תְּפִלָּה֮ לְמֹשֶׁ֢ה אִֽישׁ־הָאֱלֹ֫הִ֥ים אֲֽדֹנָ֗י מָע֣וֹן אַ֭תָּה הָיִ֥יתָ לָּ֗נוּ בְּדֹ֣ר וָדֹֽר׃	(A Prayer of Moses the man of God.) Lord, thou hast been our dwelling place in all generations.	Προσευχὴ τοῦ Μωυσῆ ἀνθρώπου τοῦ Θεοῦ. - ΚΥΡΙΕ, καταφυγὴ ἐγενήθης ἡμῖν ἐν γενεᾷ καὶ γενεᾷ·
2	בְּטֶ֤רֶם ׀ הָ֘רִ֤ים יֻלָּ֗דוּ וַתְּח֣וֹלֵֽל אֶ֣רֶץ וְתֵבֵ֑ל וּֽמֵעוֹלָ֥ם עַד־ע֝וֹלָ֗ם אַתָּ֥ה אֵֽל׃	Before the mountains were brought forth, or ever thou hadst formed the earth and the world, even from everlasting to everlasting, thou art God.	πρὸ τοῦ ὄρη γενηθῆναι καὶ πλασθῆναι τὴν γῆν καὶ τὴν οἰκουμένην, καὶ ἀπὸ τοῦ αἰῶνος καὶ ἕως τοῦ αἰῶνος σὺ εἶ.
3	תָּשֵׁ֣ב אֱ֭נוֹשׁ עַד־דַּכָּ֑א וַ֝תֹּ֗אמֶר שׁ֣וּבוּ בְנֵֽי־אָדָֽם׃	Thou turnest man to destruction; and sayest, Return, ye children of men.	μὴ ἀποστρέψῃς ἄνθρωπον εἰς ταπείνωσιν· καὶ εἶπας· ἐπιστρέψατε υἱοὶ τῶν ἀνθρώπων.
4	כִּ֤י אֶ֪לֶף שָׁנִ֡ים בְּֽעֵינֶ֗יךָ כְּי֣וֹם אֶ֭תְמוֹל כִּ֣י יַֽעֲבֹ֑ר וְאַשְׁמוּרָ֥ה בַלָּֽיְלָה׃	For a thousand years in thy sight are but as yesterday when it is past, and as a watch in the night.	ὅτι χίλια ἔτη ἐν ὀφθαλμοῖς σου ὡς ἡμέρα ἡ ἐχθές, ἥτις διῆλθε, καὶ φυλακὴ ἐν νυκτί.
5	זְ֭רַמְתָּם שֵׁנָ֣ה יִהְי֑וּ בַּ֝בֹּ֗קֶר כֶּחָצִ֥יר יַחֲלֹֽף׃	Thou carriest them away as with a flood; they are as a sleep: in the morning they are like grass which groweth up.	τὰ ἐξουδενώματα αὐτῶν ἔτη ἔσονται. τὸ πρωΐ ὡσεὶ χλόη παρέλθοι,
6	בַּ֭בֹּקֶר יָצִ֣יץ וְחָלָ֑ף לָ֝עֶ֗רֶב יְמוֹלֵ֥ל וְיָבֵֽשׁ׃	In the morning it flourisheth, and groweth up; in the evening it is cut down, and withereth.	τὸ πρωΐ ἀνθήσαι καὶ παρέλθοι, τὸ ἑσπέρας ἀποπέσοι, σκληρυνθείη καὶ ξηρανθείη.
7	כִּֽי־כָלִ֥ינוּ בְאַפֶּ֑ךָ וּֽבַחֲמָתְךָ֥ נִבְהָֽלְנוּ׃	For we are consumed by thine anger, and by thy wrath are we troubled.	ὅτι ἐξελίπομεν ἐν τῇ ὀργῇ σου καὶ ἐν τῷ θυμῷ σου ἐταράχθημεν.
8	שַׁתָּ֣ עֲוֺנֹתֵ֣ינוּ לְנֶגְדֶּ֑ךָ עֲ֝לֻמֵ֗נוּ לִמְא֥וֹר פָּנֶֽיךָ׃	Thou hast set our iniquities before thee, our secret sins in the light of thy countenance.	ἔθου τὰς ἀνομίας ἡμῶν ἐναντίον σου· αἰὼν ἡμῶν εἰς φωτισμὸν τοῦ προσώπου σου.
9	כִּ֣י כׇל־יָ֭מֵינוּ פָּנ֣וּ בְעֶבְרָתֶ֑ךָ כִּלִּ֖ינוּ שָׁנֵ֣ינוּ כְמוֹ־הֶֽגֶה׃	For all our days are passed away in thy wrath: we spend our years as a tale that is told.	ὅτι πᾶσαι αἱ ἡμέραι ἡμῶν ἐξέλιπον, καὶ ἐν τῇ ὀργῇ σου ἐξελίπομεν· τὰ ἔτη ἡμῶν ὡσεὶ ἀράχνη ἐμελέτων.
10	יְמֵֽי־שְׁנוֹתֵ֨ינוּ בָהֶ֥ם שִׁבְעִ֪ים שָׁנָ֡ה וְאִ֤ם בִּגְבוּרֹ֨ת ׀ שְׁמ֘וֹנִ֤ים שָׁנָ֗ה וְ֭רׇהְבָּם עָמָ֣ל וָאָ֑וֶן כִּי־גָ֥ז חִ֝֗ישׁ וַנָּעֻֽפָה׃	The days of our years are threescore years and ten; and if by reason of strength they be fourscore years, yet is their strength labour and sorrow; for it is soon cut off, and we fly away.	αἱ ἡμέραι τῶν ἐτῶν ἡμῶν ἐν αὐτοῖς ἑβδομήκοντα ἔτη, ἐὰν δὲ ἐν δυναστείαις, ὀγδοήκοντα ἔτη, καὶ τὸ πλεῖον αὐτῶν κόπος καὶ πόνος· ὅτι ἐπῆλθε πρᾳότης ἐφ᾿ ἡμᾶς, καὶ παιδευθησόμεθα.
11	מִֽי־י֭וֹדֵעַ עֹ֣ז אַפֶּ֑ךָ וּ֝כְיִרְאָתְךָ֗ עֶבְרָתֶֽךָ׃	Who knoweth the power of thine anger? even according to thy fear, so is thy wrath.	τίς γινώσκει τὸ κράτος τῆς ὀργῆς σου καὶ ἀπὸ τοῦ φόβου σου τὸν θυμόν σου ἐξαριθμήσασθαι;
12	לִמְנ֣וֹת יָ֭מֵינוּ כֵּ֣ן הוֹדַ֑ע וְ֝נָבִ֗א לְבַ֣ב חׇכְמָֽה׃	So teach us to number our days, that we may apply our hearts unto wisdom.	τὴν δεξιάν σου οὕτω γνώρισόν μοι καὶ τοὺς πεπαιδευμένους τῇ καρδίᾳ ἐν σοφίᾳ.
13	שׁוּבָ֣ה יְ֭הֹוָה עַד־מָתָ֑י וְ֝הִנָּחֵ֗ם עַל־עֲבָדֶֽיךָ׃	Return, O LORD, how long? and let it repent thee concerning thy servants.	ἐπίστρεψον, Κύριε· ἕως πότε; καὶ παρακλήθητι ἐπὶ τοῖς δούλοις σου.
14	שַׂבְּעֵ֣נוּ בַבֹּ֣קֶר חַסְדֶּ֑ךָ וּֽנְרַנְּנָ֥ה וְ֝נִשְׂמְחָ֗ה בְּכׇל־יָמֵֽינוּ׃	O satisfy us early with thy mercy; that we may rejoice and be glad all our days.	ἐνεπλήσθημεν τὸ πρωΐ τοῦ ἐλέους σου, Κύριε, καὶ ἠγαλλιασάμεθα καὶ εὐφράνθημεν ἐν πάσαις ταῖς ἡμέραις ἡμῶν· εὐφρανθείημεν
15	שַׂ֭מְּחֵנוּ כִּימ֣וֹת עִנִּיתָ֑נוּ שְׁ֝נ֗וֹת רָאִ֥ינוּ רָעָֽה׃	Make us glad according to the days wherein thou hast afflicted us, and the years wherein we have seen evil.	ἀνθ᾿ ὧν ἡμερῶν ἐταπείνωσας ἡμᾶς, ἐτῶν, ὧν εἴδομεν κακά.
16	יֵרָאֶ֣ה אֶל־עֲבָדֶ֣יךָ פׇעֳלֶ֑ךָ וַ֝הֲדָרְךָ֗ עַל־בְּנֵיהֶֽם׃	Let thy work appear unto thy servants, and thy glory unto their children.	καὶ ἴδε ἐπὶ τοὺς δούλους σου καὶ ἐπὶ τὰ ἔργα σου καὶ ὁδήγησον τοὺς υἱοὺς αὐτῶν,
17	וִיהִ֤י ׀ נֹ֤עַם אֲדֹנָ֥י אֱלֹהֵ֗ינוּ עָ֫לֵ֥ינוּ וּמַעֲשֵׂ֣ה יָ֭דֵינוּ כּוֹנְנָ֥ה עָלֵ֑ינוּ וּֽמַעֲשֵׂ֥ה יָ֝דֵ֗ינוּ כּוֹנְנֵֽהוּ׃	And let the beauty of the LORD our God be upon us: and establish thou the work of our hands upon us; yea, the work of our hands establish thou it.	καὶ ἔστω ἡ λαμπρότης Κυρίου τοῦ Θεοῦ ἡμῶν ἐφ᾿ ἡμᾶς, καὶ τὰ ἔργα τῶν χειρῶν ἡμῶν κατεύθυνον ἐφ᾿ ἡμᾶς καὶ τὸ ἔργον τῶν χειρῶν ἡμῶν κατεύθυνον.

== Sources ==
- Danziger, Hillel; Scherman, Nosson (1989). The ArtScroll Tehillim: Psalms. Mesorah Publications. ISBN 978-0-89906-673-8.
- Kirkpatrick, A. F. (1901). The Book of Psalms: with Introduction and Notes. The Cambridge Bible for Schools and Colleges. Vol. Book IV and V: Psalms XC-CL. Cambridge: University Press. p. 839.
- Würthwein, Ernst (1995). The Text of the Old Testament. Translated by Rhodes, Erroll F. Grand Rapids, MI: William B. Eerdmans. ISBN 0-8028-0788-7.
- Zlotowitz, Meir (1990). Siddur: The Complete ArtScroll Siddur : English & Hebrew. Mesorah Publications. ISBN 978-0-89906-650-9.
