= Betty Bumpers =

American activist (1925–2018)

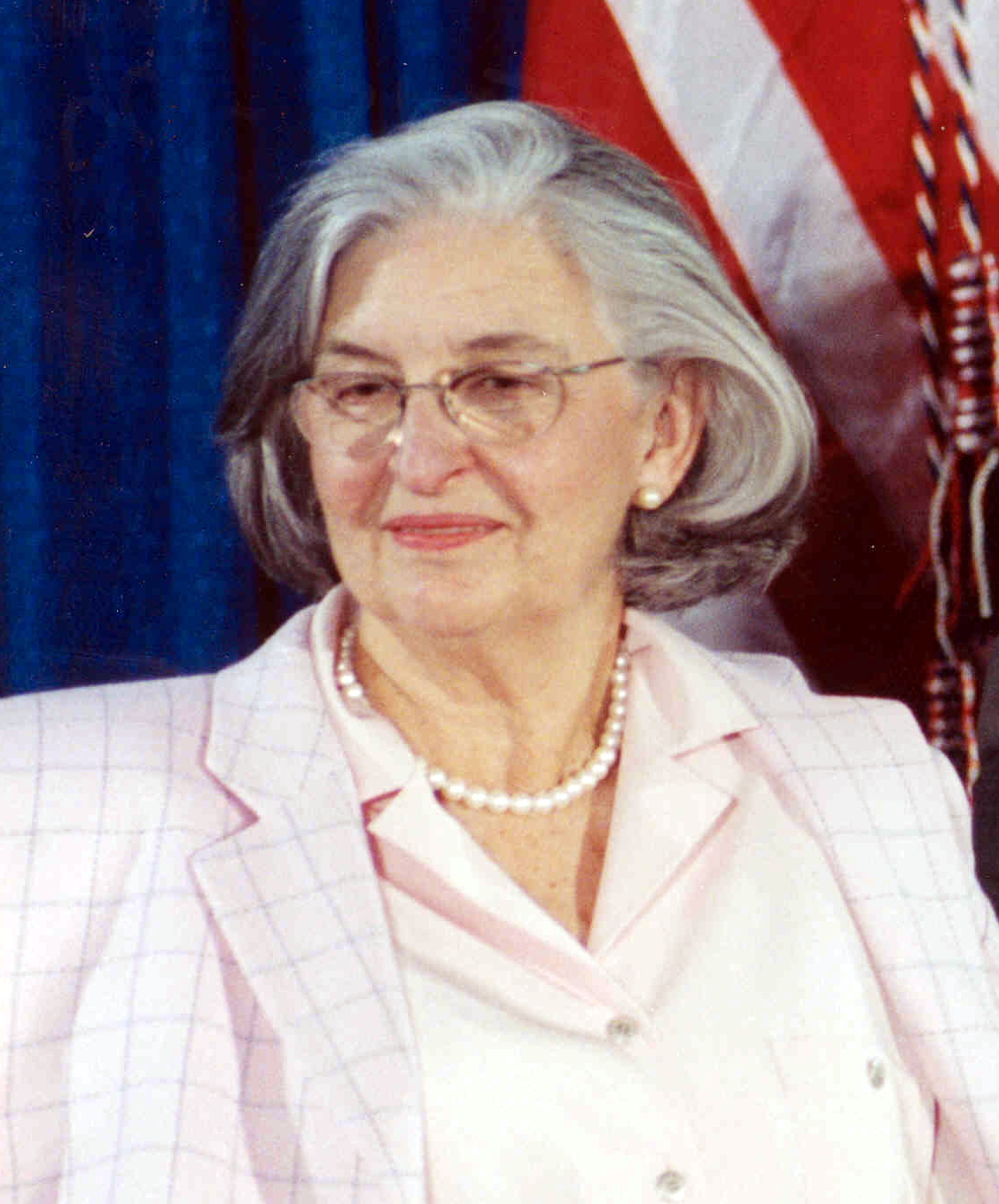
- Bumpers in 1999

First Lady of Arkansas
- In role January 12, 1971 – January 3, 1975
- Governor: Dale Bumpers
- Preceded by: Jeannette Edris Rockefeller
- Succeeded by: Claudia Riley (acting)

Personal details
- Born: Betty Lou Flanagan; January 11, 1925 Grand Prairie Community, Arkansas, U.S.
- Died: November 23, 2018 (aged 93) Little Rock, Arkansas, U.S.
- Spouse: Dale Bumpers (m. 1949; died 2016)
- Children: 3
- Occupation: Teacher; Activist
- Known for: Advocacy for immunizations and world peace

Betty Lou Bumpers (née Flanagan; January 11, 1925 – November 23, 2018) was an American politician, advocate for childhood immunizations, and world peace activist, who served as the First Lady of Arkansas from 1971 to 1975. Together, she and Rosalynn Carter ran a successful campaign to ensure that all American school children were immunized. Bumpers was the wife of Dale Bumpers, who served as governor of Arkansas from 1971 to 1975 and as a U.S. Senator from 1975 to 1999.

== Early life ==
Bumpers was born in the Grand Prairie community in Franklin County, Arkansas, to salesman and auctioneer Herman Edward "Babe" Flanagan and his wife, the former Ola Callans, a teacher. She grew up in Franklin County, except for a period during World War II when her family lived in Fort Smith and in the state of Iowa.

After studying at the Chicago Academy of Fine Arts and Iowa State University, she taught elementary school. In 1949 she married Dale Bumpers, a high school classmate who was then in law school at Northwestern University. After her husband finished law school, the couple settled in Charleston, Arkansas, where Dale Bumpers practiced law and Betty worked as an elementary school teacher. They had three children.

== Advocacy for childhood immunization ==
In 1970, Dale Bumpers was elected governor and after his inauguration in 1971, she became the state's first lady. In that role, she decided to focus on the well-being of children and families.

Responding to Arkansas' having one of the lowest rates of childhood immunization in the United States, she initiated a statewide campaign to immunize all of the state's children against childhood diseases. Her Every Child by '74 program, which involved cooperative effort by state government, professional organizations of doctors and nurses, the Arkansas National Guard, the University of Arkansas extension service, faith-based organizations, and other volunteers. It was a very successful campaign, delivering immunizations to over 350,000 children on just one Saturday near its peak. As a result of the program, the state attained one of the highest childhood immunization rates of any U.S. state. The Arkansas program was adopted by the U.S. Centers for Disease Control and Prevention as a model for nationwide use.

Dale Bumpers entered the U.S. Senate in 1975, and the couple moved to Washington, D.C. Two years later, when Jimmy Carter arrived in Washington as the new President, Betty Bumpers sought his support for a nationwide program of childhood immunization and enlisted the assistance of First Lady Rosalynn Carter. After finding only a small number of states required children to be immunized before entering school, the two women joined forces and undertook a campaign to convince every state to adopt this requirement. After just two years of advocacy work focused on individual state governments, they achieved their goal of having all 50 U.S. states require immunization for school entry.

A measles epidemic in 1989-1991 that killed more than two hundred children led to a new collaboration between Bumpers and Carter. Concerned that preschool children were vulnerable to preventable illnesses because they were not getting immunized on schedule, they founded the organization Every Child By Two, with the aim of assuring immunizations for all American children by the age of two. Bumpers said that the group's efforts to establish outreach programs and immunization registers in each state had contributed to an immunization rate of 90 percent for children from birth to age two in 2012.

== Peace Links ==
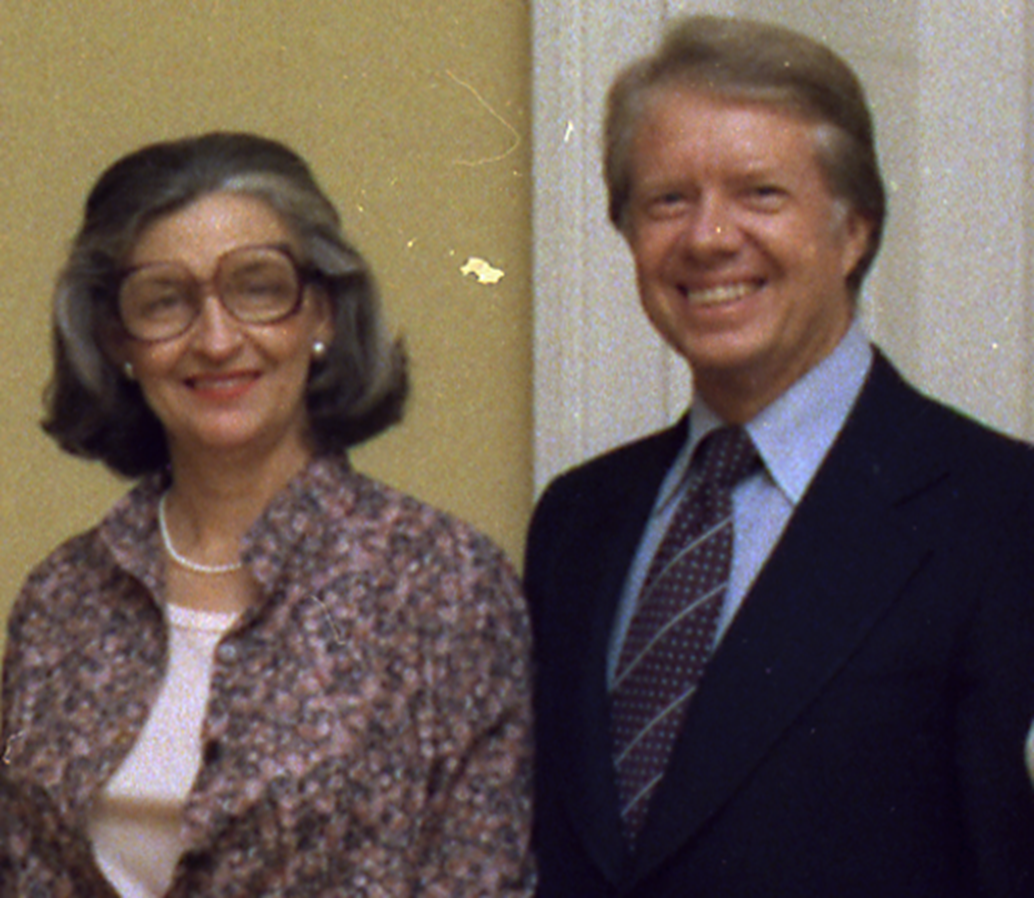
Bumpers with President Jimmy Carter at the White House

A 1981 conversation with her college-student daughter Brooke inspired Bumpers to become a peace activist, focused on ending the nuclear weapons race. While driving together to Washington, D.C., they crossed the Clinch River, the namesake of the Clinch River Breeder Reactor Project, leading Brooke to ask her mother what the family would do in a nuclear war or the aftermath of a nuclear disaster. Bumpers' light-hearted response of "Well, honey, I guess we'd just go back to Arkansas" did not silence her daughter, who responded "Don't be so stupid, Mother," and asked what would happen if Arkansas was destroyed. The realization her daughter considered nuclear war to be a real threat to her future motivated Bumpers to start a campaign for peace.

After discussing the matter with her fellow Senate wives and other like-minded women in Washington, Bumpers decided to work to bring mainstream American women into the campaign for a nuclear weapons freeze, building on her earlier experience with grassroots volunteer activism. She started the organization Peace Links in Little Rock in 1982, Peace Links worked with established women's groups such as garden clubs, parent teacher associations, and church organizations to educate women about the consequences of the nuclear arms race and to engage them in campaigning for world peace. Within a short time, Peace Links expanded beyond Arkansas and counted some 30,000 members around the United States. It operated as a national organization for nearly 20 years, disbanding in 2001 after the end of the Cold War.

== Later life ==
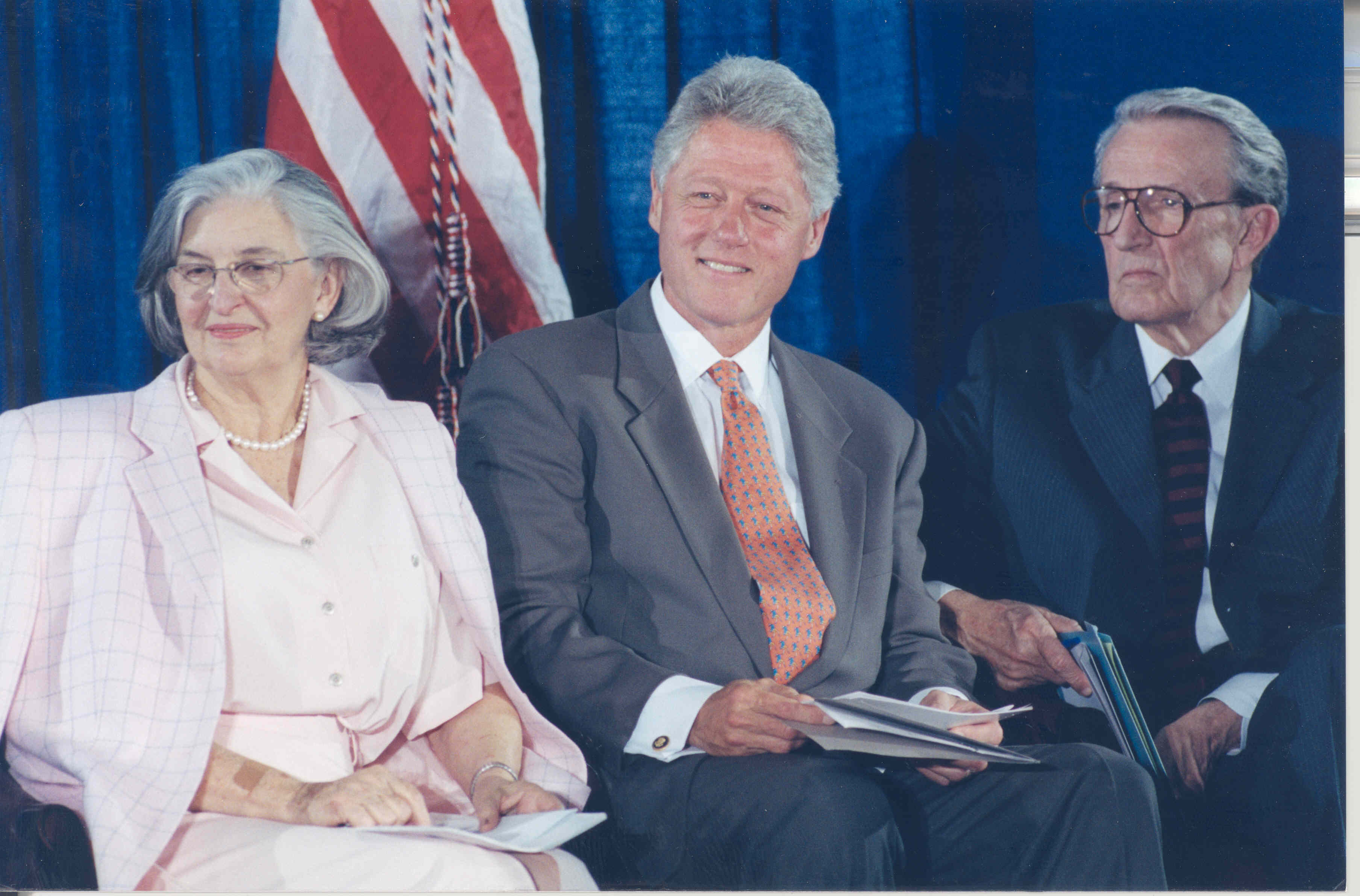
Bumpers, Bill Clinton, and Dale Bumpers in 1999

In their later years, the Bumpers lived in Little Rock, Arkansas. She and Rosalynn Carter continued to be involved with the leadership of Every Child By Two in her later years. Her husband of 66 years Dale Bumpers died of complications from Alzheimer's disease in January 2016.

On November 23, 2018, Bumpers died from complications of dementia and a broken hip in Little Rock at the age of 93.

== Awards and recognitions ==
The National Institutes of Health Vaccine Research Center was named for Betty and Dale Bumpers in recognition of their efforts to promote childhood immunizations and vaccine research.

Among the awards that Bumpers received were:

- Woman of Conscience Award from the National Council of Women of the United States, 1985
- The first Wilton Peace Prize from the Unitarian Universalist Church, 1986
- Distinguished Citizen Award, jointly presented by the Governor of Arkansas, the Arkansas Office of Volunteerism and KARK-TV, 1987
- Peacemakers Award from the National Peace Institute Foundation, 1989
- Pediatric Nursing Humanitarian Award, 1992
- Surgeon General's Medallion, from U.S. Surgeon General Antonia C. Novello, 1993
- Isaac K. Beckes Award of the National League for Nursing, awarded for service to the League by a non-nurse of national stature, 1997
- Rotary International Polio Eradication Champion award, 1998
- Centers For Disease Control and Prevention Champion of Prevention award, 2000
- Hepatitis Foundation International Humanitarian Award, 2001
- 2005, Induction into the National Women's Hall of Fame
- Billie Ann Myers Paragon Award from the Arkansas Department of Human Services Division of Community Service and Non-profit Support, 2012

In 1994, Peace Links gave her a special Peace Links Founders Award. In 1995, she and her husband shared the Maxwell Finland Award of the National Foundation for Infectious Diseases; in 1998, they shared the March of Dimes Citizen of the Year Award, recognizing their commitment to children's health and polio eradication. The couple also were joint recipients of the Excellence in Public Service Award of the American Academy of Pediatrics.

Bumpers received honorary degrees from Hendrix College in Conway, Arkansas; the University of Arkansas at Little Rock, and the University of Massachusetts.

== See also ==
- The Ribbon International

Honorary titles
Preceded by Jeannette Edris Rockefeller	First Lady of Arkansas; 1971–1975	Succeeded by Claudia Riley
