= Miriam Khalil =

Canadian-Lebanese opera singer

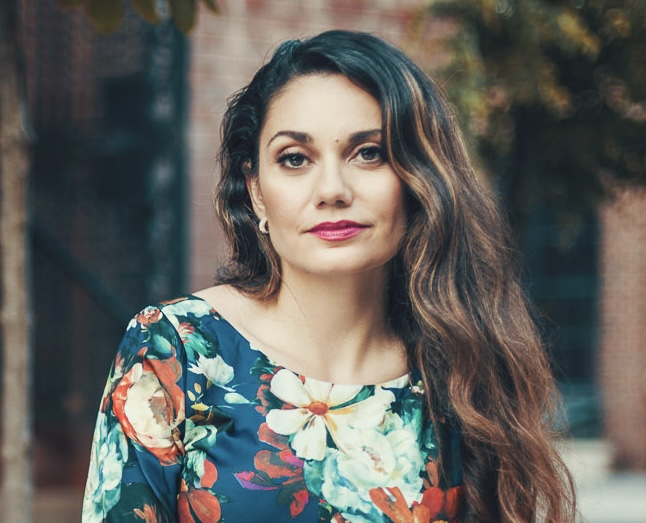
- Portrait of Khalil by Shayne Gray Media
- Born: Damascus, Syria
- Education: Britten-Pears Young Artist Programme, Royal Conservatory of Music, University of Ottawa
- Occupation: Operatic soprano
- Years active: 2003–present
- Website: miriamkhalil.com

Miriam Khalil is a Canadian-Lebanese opera singer. She is sought after for her interpretation of the works of Golijov, Puccini, and Mozart. She also teaches voice at the University of Alberta.

== Early life and education ==
Miriam Khalil was born in Damascus, Syria, and later emigrated to Ottawa, Canada. She earned a Bachelor of Music in Voice from the University of Ottawa, and further advanced her studies by obtaining an Artist Diploma from the Glenn Gould School at the Royal Conservatory of Music in Toronto. She went on to participate in training programs, including the Steans Institute for Young Artists at Ravinia and the Britten-Pears Young Artist Programme.

Khalil is also a graduate of the Canadian Opera Company's Ensemble Studio, a program that cultivates emerging opera talents.

== Career ==
Khalil has continued to expand her repertoire, performing Leila in The Pearl Fishers with Vancouver Opera, Donna Elvira in Don Giovanni with the National Arts Centre Orchestra in Ottawa, and Sabine in Mary Kouyoumdjia and Royce Vavrek's opera Adoration at the Prototype Festival in New York. Her performances are characterized by a deep emotional connection to the material and a rich, versatile voice.

Khalil's career highlights also include her celebrated interpretation of Osvaldo Golijov’s Ayre, a song cycle that she has performed to critical acclaim across North and South America, including a debut at the Kirchner Cultural Centre in Buenos Aires. The album Ayre: Live earned her a Juno Award nomination for Classical Album of the Year: Vocal or Choral.

During the COVID-19 pandemic, Khalil transitioned to digital platforms, participating in virtual productions such as Against the Grain Theatre's Messiah/Complex, a multilingual adaptation of Handel’s Messiah that was widely praised and led to her second Juno Award nomination. She also directed a film adaptation of Holst’s Sāvitri (a chamber opera) and created an online Arabic recital titled Songs My Parents Taught Me as part of Pacific Opera Victoria's ‘For All to Hear’ series.

== Discography and videography ==
=== Recordings ===
- AYRE: LIVE with the Against the Grain Ensemble
- Messiah/Complex with the Toronto Symphony Orchestra
- BOUND with the Toronto Symphony Orchestra

=== Video appearances ===
- Khalil appears in a 2008 feature documentary film, The Audition, which tracked the lives and progress of the winners and participants of the Met's National Council Auditions.
- O Canada (in Arabic)
- O Canada for The Toronto Symphony Orchestra
- Messiah/Complex - "If God be for Us"

== Awards and recognition ==
Khalil has been the recipient of multiple awards and grants from esteemed organizations such as the George London Foundation, the Canada Council for the Arts, the Ontario Arts Council, and the Metropolitan Opera National Council Audition Scholarships.
