= Against the Grain Theatre =

Opera company based in Toronto, Ontario

- Interactive map of Against the Grain Theatre
- Address: 2149 Yonge St #202, Toronto, Ontario, Canada
- Coordinates: 43°42′14″N 79°23′51″W
- Type: Performing arts Company

Construction
- Opened: 2010

Website
- atgtheatre.com

Against the Grain Theatre, often abbreviated as AtG, is a Canadian opera company based in Toronto, Ontario.

== History ==
AtG was founded in 2010 by Joel Ivany, who was the company's artistic director until 2023. They are responsible for the production of the film "Messiah/Complex" and the ongoing Opera Pub series.

AtG is a Canadian experimental opera company dedicated to creating vocal works and films staged in surprising locations, with an emphasis on storytelling and artistic experiences. Their performances have given them notable recognition and have been featured by the NYTimes and the BBC along with coverage from across Canada by CBC National, The Globe and Mail, Toronto Star, Macleans, Chatelaine.

== Notable events ==
Year	Events
2010-2011	An Unexpected Evening of Shakespeare is performed at Toronto’s Heliconian Hall La bohème is reinterpreted and staged at the Tranzac Club.
2012-2013	The 7 Deadly Sins and Holier Fare are performed at Gallery 345 Figaro's Wedding (Le Nozze di Figaro) opens. AtG wraps up the year with its first production of Messiah
2014-2015	Banff Centre for Arts and Creativity announces a new partnership with Against the Grain Theatre and The Canadian Opera Company AtG effect on Banff Centre’s opera program is a success with its first two production, Pelléas et Mélisande and #UncleJohn AtG returns in December with Messiah, which earns the company the Dora Award for Outstanding Performance Ensemble.
2016-2017	In November, AtG stages Ayre, the bold, original work by Osvaldo Golijov. A little too cozy is staged and receives a Dora Award nomination. The Canadian Opera Company announces AtG as the first-ever company–in–residence in the history of Canada’s largest opera organization.
2018-2019	An international co-production of Orphée⁺ between Opera Columbus, Banff Centre for Arts and Creativity and AtG is rehearsed at Banff Centre and premiers in Toronto. In August, AtG launches its National Opera Intensive, a summer opera program for students. AtG performs A Kurt Weill cabaret at the Yukon Arts Centre. AtG Records releases its first album, "Ayre: Live." AtG, the Banff Centre for Arts and Creativity, and CBC Music collaborate to present a national tour of La Bohème in bars across Canada. A feature in The Globe and Mail chronicles the ambitious and experimental cross-Canada opera trek, hailing the tour as "groundbreaking."
2020-2021	In January, AYRE is performed at the 21C music festival at Toronto’s Koerner Hall. Messiah/Complex also earns international media attention and is featured by the NYTimes. The NYTimes calls AtG’s Messiah/Complex "A Messiah for the Multitudes, Freed from History’s Bonds." Messiah/Complex premieres in partnership with the Toronto Symphony Orchestra
2022	Messiah/Complex receives a JUNOS nomination in the category of Classical Album of the Year, Large Ensemble.

== Awards and nominations ==
Against the Grain Theatre has received awards, including the Dora Mavor Moore Award for Outstanding Production in 2014 and 2017, and the 2022 Awards for Digital Excellence in Opera by OPERA America.

AtG has received over 25 Dora nominations and won multiple categories for numerous productions.

Year	Production	Nominations
2014	Figaro's Wedding	Outstanding New Opera 2014 (Won); Outstanding Production (Nominated); Outstanding Direction (Nominated)
2015	#UncleJohn	Best New Opera; Best Male Performance; Best Ensemble
2016	Messiah	Outstanding Ensemble Performance (Nominated)
2018	La Bohème	Outstanding Production – Opera Division; Outstanding New Musical/Opera – Joel Ivany for New English libretto, based on Giacomo Puccini; Outstanding Direction – Joel Ivany
2018	Orphée⁺	Outstanding Production – Opera Division; Outstanding Performance: Female — Marcy Richardson; Outstanding Performance: Ensemble – The Ensemble: The Ensemble Dancers of Company XIV; Outstanding Direction – Joel Ivany; Outstanding Scenic Design – S. Katy Tucker; Outstanding Costume Design – Zane Pihlström; Outstanding Lighting Design – JAX Messenger; Outstanding Choreography – Austin McCormick; Outstanding Musical Direction – Topher Mokrzewski
2023	Bluebeard’s Castle	Outstanding Production-Opera division(Won); Outstanding Performance by an Individual: Gerald Finley, Bluebeard’s Castle(Won); Outstanding Direction: Daisy Evans, Bluebeard’s Castle(Won)
