= Alice Henson Ernst =

American dramatist (1880–1980)

Alice Henson Ernst (September 3, 1880 – February 12, 1980) was an American playwright, professor and author. She conducted anthropological work among the Native Americans in Oregon. Ernst was also well-known for her history and research of pioneer theater in the northwest. Ernst taught English and drama at the University of Washington and the University of Oregon.

== Biography ==
Alice Henson was born in Washburne, Maine. She grew up as an only child in Port Angeles, Washington, where her mother ran a restaurant after her father, a shoemaker, left the family to pursue business in other parts of Washington. She earned a bachelors of arts, magna cum laude, from the University of Washington (UW) in 1912, and then went on to receive her master's degree in 1913. Further graduate work was completed at Radcliffe in 1919 and 1920, and also at Yale University.

Ernst met her husband, Rudolph H. Ernst, at UW.

== Career ==
From 1920 to 1923 she was a professor at UW. She later became an English professor at the University of Oregon (UO) from 1924 to 1950. She also taught drama at UO. Between 1952 and 1953, she had a research grant at UO and also did freelance writing. The grant allowed her to visit historic areas of Oregon.

In 1936, she studied mask-making among the Native Americans in Klamath Falls. She published her research on Native Americans and mask-making and rituals using the masks in a paper called "Masks of the Northwest Coast". The La Grande Observer called her an authority on "northwest Indians". The Wolf Ritual of the Northwest Coast (1948) was published using research from interviews of Native Americans in the northwest and on Vancouver Island. She also displayed collections of masks she had obtained at UO.

Ernst was also interested in "primitive theater" and wrote about early theater in the Pacific northwest in Trouping in the Oregon Country (1961). The Eugene Register-Guard called her "a leading authority on the history of theater in the Northwest."

Ernst was a member of Beta Sigma Phi, and the Eugene chapter of the National League of American Pen Women (NLAPW). She was also a charter member of the Eugene Very Little Theatre (VLT).

== Writings ==
Ernst's first plays were written in at Radcliffe in George Pierce Baker's "47 Workshop". She later wrote more while she attended the Yale School of Drama.

Her play, Spring Sluicing (1927), won a first prize in a national Drama League of America contest in 1927. Spring Sluicing takes place in the northwest and Alaska. The play was performed in Portland in the fall of 1927. Woman's clubs, like the Fortnightly Club of Eugene did readings of Spring Sluicing. Spring Sluicing was published in Goin' Home, And Other Plays of the 1927 Contest (1929). Later, it was published again in the collection, High Country (1935), which also contained other plays written by Ernst. The Salt Lake Tribune wrote that Ernst's plays "possess strong dramatic power".

She published "Dramatic Trails of the Northwest" in Theatre Arts Magazine in 1927. In 1930, Theater Arts Magazine published her one-act play, The Valley of Lost Men. Also in 1930, OU's Guild Theatre debuted her play, Afternoon of a Nymph. Nymph described as a fantasy set in modern times. In 1932, the Portland Civic Theatre performed Welcome Stranger. Stranger is a "study of manners several thousand years ago and in this modern day," according to The Salt Lake Tribune.

A performance of The Wooden Wife in 1936 by the Very Little Theatre (VLT) in Eugene included piano music written and performed by George Hopkins. The Wooden Wife takes place in a Native American dwelling. The play won first place at the Northwest Writers' Conference.

In 1938, she published another collection of plays, Backstage in Xanadu, which included illustrations by Constance Cole. The book included the plays Cloistered Calm, Welcome Stranger, Nightingale and Afternoon of a Nymph. Cloistered Calm is a comedy about "underpaid professors", while Nightingale is a romance set in Bagdad. She was again published in Theatre Arts Magazine in 1939, with an illustrated article called "Northwest Animal Dances". Ernst's poetry appeared in the anthology, Mid-Country: Writings From the Heart of America (1945). Her play, Way Out There, a "comic-drama", set in the Oregon of the 1800s, was performed at VLT in 1946.

Ernst's history of theater in Oregon, Trouping in the Oregon Country (1961), was considered "enjoyable" by historian, Kenneth L. Holmes, of the Eugene Guard. The book won first place from the Oregon Press Women (OPW). The book was a culmination of a decade's worth of research.

== Publications ==
- The Valley of Lost Men. Evanston, Illinois: Row, Peterson. 1932. OCLC 4168581.
- High Country: Four Plays From the Pacific Northwest. Portland, Oregon: Metropolitan Press. 1935. OCLC 3136109.
- Backstage in Xanadu: A Book of Plays. Portland, Oregon: Binfords & Mort. 1938. OCLC 613145257.
- The Wolf-ritual of the Northwest Coast. Eugene, Oregon: University of Oregon. 1952. OCLC 912647675.
- Trouping in the Oregon Country: A History of Frontier Theatre. Portland, Oregon: Oregon Historical Society. 1961. OCLC 647632755.
