= Janet Huckabee =

American politician and former First Lady of Arkansas

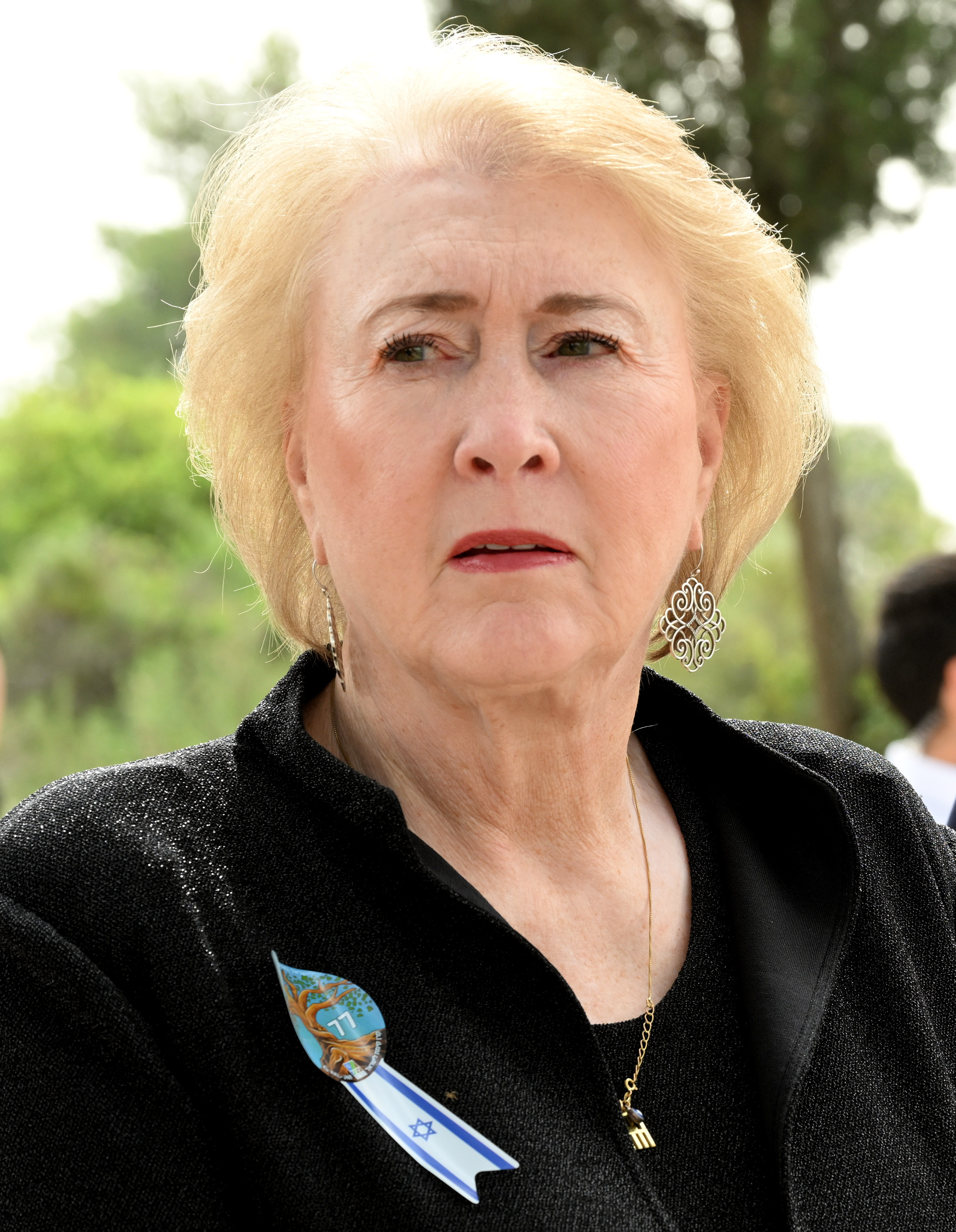
- Huckabee in 2025

First Lady of Arkansas
- In role July 15, 1996 – January 8, 2007
- Governor: Mike Huckabee
- Preceded by: Betty Tucker
- Succeeded by: Ginger Beebe

Second Lady of Arkansas
- In role November 20, 1993 – July 15, 1996
- Preceded by: Betty Tucker
- Succeeded by: Lisenne Dudderar Rockefeller

Personal details
- Born: Janet McCain; July 16, 1955 (age 71) Lake Charles, Louisiana, U.S.
- Party: Republican
- Spouse: Mike Huckabee (m. 1974)
- Children: 3, including Sarah
- Education: Ouachita Baptist University; John Brown University

Janet Huckabee (née McCain; born July 16, 1955) is an American politician, the wife of former 2008 and 2016 Republican presidential candidate and former Arkansas governor, Mike Huckabee. She served as the first lady of Arkansas, from July 1996 until January 2007 and oversaw a total remodel of the Arkansas Governor's Mansion, including the addition of the Grand Hall ballroom. Huckabee was also a Republican nominee for Arkansas secretary of state in 2002. She is also the mother of current and first female governor of Arkansas, Sarah Huckabee Sanders.

== Early life and education ==
Huckabee was born in Lake Charles in Calcasieu Parish in southwestern Louisiana, the fourth of five siblings. As an infant, she moved with her family to Hope, Arkansas. She is the daughter of the former Pat (Potter) Stephens, who served four two-year terms from 1965 to 1972 as the county clerk for Hempstead County, Arkansas, and Angus Bouie McCain. She graduated from Hope High School in 1973 and married her high-school sweetheart, Mike Huckabee, the following year. She holds a bachelor's degree in organizational management from John Brown University.

== Political career ==
In 2002, she was the Republican Party nominee for Arkansas secretary of state in the same election that her husband was seeking a second term as governor. She was defeated by the Democratic Party nominee, state land commissioner Charlie Daniels, by a margin of 62.1%-37.9%. Her husband fared better in his re-election bid, having defeated his Democratic opponent, state treasurer Jimmie Lou Fisher. Huckabee carried only one county, Benton County in the northwest corner of the state.

The following year, she earned an undergraduate degree in organizational management from John Brown University in Siloam Springs, Arkansas. For a time, she worked in a management capacity with Hanke Brothers Construction Company in Hot Springs until her husband began his 2008 presidential bid.

== Personal life ==
Within two years of her marriage, she was diagnosed with spinal cancer. Faced with the possibility of paralysis and the inability to have children, she underwent surgery and six weeks of radiation therapy. She eventually recovered and gave birth to three children: two sons, John Mark Huckabee and David Huckabee, and a daughter, Sarah Huckabee Sanders, the 31st White House press secretary and current governor of Arkansas.

Prior to becoming first lady of Arkansas, she was involved with the Texarkana, Arkansas, Parent Teacher Association, of which she was the president for two terms. In Texarkana, she was active in the Beech Street First Baptist Church and with the ACTS-TV station. She was employed for a time by the Texarkana public schools as a substitute teacher, for St. Michael Hospital, and as a pharmacist's assistant.

Party political offices
Preceded by Rose Bryant Jones	Republican nominee for Secretary of State of Arkansas; 2002	Succeeded by Jim Lagrone
Honorary titles
Preceded by Betty Tucker	First Lady of Arkansas; 1996–2007	Succeeded by Ginger Beebe
