= Beta Sigma Phi =

North American general sorority

- ΒΣΦ
- Founded: April 30, 1931; 95 years ago Abilene, Kansas
- Type: Social
- Affiliation: Independent
- Status: Active
- Scope: International
- Motto: "Life, Learning and Friendship"
- Colors: Black and gold
- Symbol: Torch
- Flower: Yellow rose
- Chapters: 4767
- Headquarters: 400 E Bannister Rd Suite E Kansas City, Missouri 64134; United States
- Website: www.betasigmaphi.org

Beta Sigma Phi International (ΒΣΦ) is an international noncollegiate sorority. Founded in Abilene Kansas, in 1931 by Walter W. Ross "for the social, cultural, and civic enrichment of its members", the organization now has chapters throughout the United States, Canada, and other countries. In 2024, it had 67,253 members.

== History ==
The organization began under the name The National What to Read Club. Walter W. Ross, the founder of Beta Sigma Phi, visited Vinita, Oklahoma, where librarian Leona Schroers agreed to help establish a chapter. The original group consisted of seven members in Abilene Kansas.

Schroers introduced Ross to Sally Rogers McSpadden, sister of the humorist Will Rogers. McSpadden, who was active in the Oklahoma Federation of Women's Clubs and other women's organizations, advised Ross to change the organization from an association to its present form and to change its name. A new framework for the organization was subsequently developed.

Beta Sigma Phi was established on April 30, 1931. In April 1932, Beta Sigma Phi was incorporated under a charter granted by the state of Missouri. Its focus was community service, the development of cultural appreciation, fostering an appreciation for the liberal arts, and fellowship. Its members consisted of women who were unable to attend college. Members presented and attended concerts, exhibitions, lectures, and plays, and they also held dance and music recitals.

Walter W. Ross & Company is the managing company for Beta Sigma Phi. In addition to the international constitution, each chapter creates its own bylaws. By 1966, the sorority had more than 8,000 chapters and 185,000 members in fifteen countries. In 1975, it had more than 10,000 chapters and over 250,000 members.

The organization initiated its millionth member, Denise Emerson, in 1995, at the Gamma Alpha Iota chapter in Ontario, California. In 2024, it had 67,253 active members, and its headquarters are in Kansas City, Missouri.

== Symbols ==
The sorority's Greek letter name is derived from its motto; the letters Beta Sigma and Phi were the first letters of the Greek words for "Life, Learning, and Friendship". Its colors are black and gold, its flower is the yellow rose, and its symbol is the torch.

== Activities ==
Beta Sigma Phi is primarily a social organization. At regular meetings, members take turns presenting cultural programs. Chapters also coordinate theater parties, tour museums, and attend concerts.

The sorority organizes annual state conventions and celebrates its Founders Day. Chapters also hold annual Valentine Balls where they select a Queen, Sweetheart, or Princess, depending on the type of chapter; the international sorority then selects an overall winner. The candidates are selected based on their representation of the ideals of Beta Sigma Phi.

The Torch is the online magazine of Beta Sigma Phi, publishing stories and poems by members, personality sketches of International Honorary Members and others, and short story and poetry contests.

== Philanthropy ==
- International Endowment Fund – Health research groups & charities
- Disaster Relief Fund – Aids members who are victims of natural disasters
- Breast Cancer Research Fund – Supports research organizations
- Scholarship Fund – Awards scholarships to members, their children and grandchildren

== Membership ==
Beta Sigma Phi is a non-political, non-sectarian organization. Its membership is open to women of all ages and backgrounds. The sorority also awards honorary memberships to women who have achieved worldwide recognition in their fields. Membership is offered at various degree levels, starting with Nu Phi Mu and continuing with Ritual of Jewels, Exemplar, and Exemplar Preceptor.

== Chapters ==
Most Beta Sigma Phi chapters are community-based, but the sorority also has several online chapters. As of 2024, it had 4,767 active chapters. Chapters are located in the United States, Australia, Germany, Canada, Mexico, Scotland and Greece. Chapters are classified as Ritual of Jewels, Exemplar, Preceptor, Laureate, Master, Torchbearer, and Online.

== Notable members ==
- Ginger Beebe, first lady of Arkansas
- Betty Boyd, Oklahoma State House of Representatives
- Valda Cooper (Farmington), journalist and reporter
- Suzanne Deuchler, Illinois House of Representatives
- Alice Henson Ernst, dramatist
- Maie Bartlett Heard, collector and philanthropist
- Alene Holt, first female alderman and first female mayor of Peterborough, Ontario
- Alvy Moore, actor
- Pat Nixon (honorary), First Lady of the United States
- Tina Louise Thomas (honorary), former Miss Pennsylvania
