= Arthur Eaglefield Hull =

British musician and music writer (1876–1928)

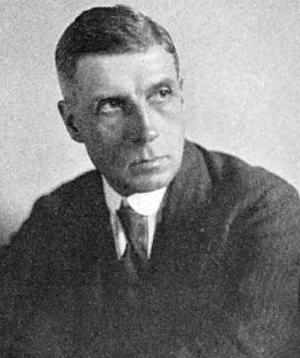
- Hull in 1924
- Born: 10 March 1876; Little Bowden, Leicestershire, England
- Died: 4 November 1928 (aged 52); Huddersfield, West Riding of Yorkshire, England
- Education: Oxford University
- Occupations: Music critic, writer, composer, organist

Arthur Eaglefield Hull (10 March 1876 – 4 November 1928) was an English music critic, writer, composer and organist. He was the founder of the original British Music Society in 1918.

== Early life and education ==
Born in Little Bowden near Market Harborough, Hull was initially a music student of the pianist and theorist Tobias Matthay and the organist Charles W Pearce (1856-1928). He graduated from Oxford University with a B.Mus in 1898 and was awarded a Doctorate of Music (Mus. Doc.) in 1903. In 1898 he was appointed organist and choirmaster at Bishop's Stortford Parish Church.

== Career ==
Hull moved to Huddersfield in Yorkshire where he founded the Huddersfield Music Club in 1900, and where he was the organist at Huddersfield Parish Church from 1904 to 1920. In 1908 he founded the School of Music in Huddersfield, forerunner to the University Music Department. In 1918 he founded the British Music Society. In these roles he championed the music of William Baines in 1920.

He became an editor of several music publications including The Monthly Musical Record (from 1912 until his death), International Library of Books on Music, Library of Music and musicians (a series of books on composers), The Music Lover's Library (short books on classical music subjects) and others. He also taught the piano and organ privately. Frederic Lord, George Oldroyd and Alfred Whitehead were among his notable pupils.

As a composer, Eaglefield Hull's organ works include the Variations poétiques sur un thème original (1911), the Prelude, Berceuse and Rêverie (1913), and the Fantasy on an old English carol (1921). There was also an orchestral Overture in A, Three Shakespeare Songs for voice and strings, and a string quartet. He produced editions of music scores, including the organ sonatas of Alexandre Guilmant.

== Author ==
Hull wrote a biography of Alexander Scriabin, and coined the term "mystic chord" to describe the harmonic and melodic device which the Russian composer used in some of his later works. He also wrote a living biography of another mystically inclined composer, Cyril Scott, for whom he had a high regard, calling him "at the least, the equal of those (composers) of any other country". Hull translated and edited biographies of Mussorgsky, Handel, Beethoven and others. He was the general editor for the reference work A Dictionary of Modern Music and Musicians (Dent, 1924), which covered the period from 1880 onwards, and wrote books and articles on subjects such as musical harmony and organ technique.

== Controversy and death ==
In 1927 his book Music: Classical, Romantic and Modern was published but material in it was found to be borrowed from other writers. How much of this was plagiarism and how much a mere careless, hasty failure to cite sources is not known, but the resultant public denunciations (led by Percy Scholes) left Hull very upset. He killed himself by falling under a train at Huddersfield station on 18 September 1928, dying some seven weeks later.

== Bibliography ==
=== Books written by Hull ===
- Organ playing: its technique and expression (London: Augener, 1911).
- Modern harmony, its explanation and application (London, Augener Ltd, 1915).
- The Sonata in Music (1916, Musicians Bookshelf)
- The Symphony in Music (1916, Musicians Bookshelf)
- A great Russian tone poet, Scriabin ("Library of Music and Musicians", London: K. Paul, Trench, Trubner, 1916).
- Harmony for students (London: Augener ltd., 1918).
- Cyril Scott, composer, poet and philosopher ("Library of Music and Musicians", London: K. Paul, Trench, Trubner, 1919).
- Music. Classical, Romantic & Modern. With Portraits And Musical Excerpts. (J.M. Dent, London and Toronto, 1927)

=== Books co-written by Hull ===
- Scott, Cyril & Hull, A. E. The Philosophy of modernism – its connection with music (London: Waverley Book Co.).
- Calvocoressi, M. D. & Hull, A. E. The national music of Russia, Musorgsky and Scriabin (London: Waverley Book).

=== Books translated and/or edited by Hull ===
- Rolland, Romain. Handel (New York : Henry Holt and Co., 1916).
- Musorgsky, the Russian musical nationalist (London : K. Paul, Trench, Trubner, 1919?).
- A Dictionary of Modern Music and Musicians (Dent, London & Toronto 1924).
