= George Lambert (baritone) =

English baritone and voice teacher in Canada

George James Lambert (17 December 1900 – 13 September 1971) was an English baritone and voice teacher who was primarily active in Canada.

Lambert was born in Long Preston. Following World War I, he studied singing in his native country with Frederic Lord while concurrently playing soccer professionally. He was highly active as an oratorio singer in England during the early 1920s. In 1923 he relocated to Rome, where he studied opera with Alfredo Martino. He made his professional opera debut in Rome soon after as Giorgio Germont in Giuseppe Verdi's La Traviata. He returned to England, where he became a frequent soloist on BBC Radio during the late 1920s. During this time Sir Henry Wood was his vocal coach.

Lambert relocated to Canada in the early 1930s to continue vocal studies with Lord who now resided in Ontario. He performed in concerts with symphony orchestras and with opera companies in many Canadian cities during the 1930s and 1940s. He was particularly active as a soloist with the Toronto Symphony Orchestra (TSO); notably performing the part of Christus in the TSO's annual presentations of Bach's St Matthew Passion with conductor Sir Ernest MacMillan and the Toronto Mendelssohn Choir every year from 1938 to 1945. One of his final performances was as Cathva in the world premiere Healey Willan's opera Deirdre which was broadcast live on CBC Radio on 20 April 1946.

Lambert retired from the stage in 1946 and thereafter dedicated his life to teaching. He had joined the voice faculty of the Toronto Conservatory of Music in 1932, and he continued to teach there until his death nearly 40 years later. A large number of his pupils have had successful singing careers, including Léonard Bilodeau, Jean Bonhomme, Pierre Boutet, Victor Braun, John Dodington, Audrey Farnell, Don Garrard, Robert Goulet, Doreen Hume, Jean Létourneau, Gwenlynn Little, Phyllis Mailing, Ermanno Mauro, Joan Maxwell, David Mills, Peter Milne, Bernard Turgeon, Jon Vickers, Alan Woodrow, and Lesia Zubrack Romanoff. He died in 1971 at the age of 70 in Toronto.

== External references ==
- Archival collection at University of Toronto Music Library
