= Frederic Lord (composer) =

English composer and conductor

Frederic Lord (15 November 1886 – 15 August 1945) was an English choral conductor, organist, composer, and music educator.

Lord was born in Bingley. He studied piano with Ladislas Gorski in Montreux, Switzerland and the organ with Arthur Eaglefield Hull in England. A child prodigy, he started giving organ recitals at the age of 10 and began working as a church organist at the age of 11. He was organist at Barnoldswick, Lancashire, and at Settle, Yorkshire before moving to Brantford, Ontario in Canada in 1923. From 1923 until his death in 1945 he served as the organist and choirmaster at the First Baptist Church in Brantford and as the music director of the Ontario School for the Blind. In 1928 he founded the Canadian Choir of Brantford which he conducted until his death. The choir drew praise from critics both at home and abroad, making several tours to the United States and Europe. The choir notably gave performances at Albert Hall in London and at Carnegie Hall in New York City. The choir included in its repertoire several works written by Lord. In addition to his choral compositions, Lord also wrote several works for the organ and the piano, one symphony, the cantata The Battle of Morgarten, and a setting of Psalm 90 for baritone solo, choir, and orchestra.

Lord was also a voice teacher. His most notable pupil was baritone George Lambert. He died at the age of 58 in Brantford. The National Library of Canada holds several of his papers.
