= Mary Kavanaugh Eagle =

American church worker, social leader, editor

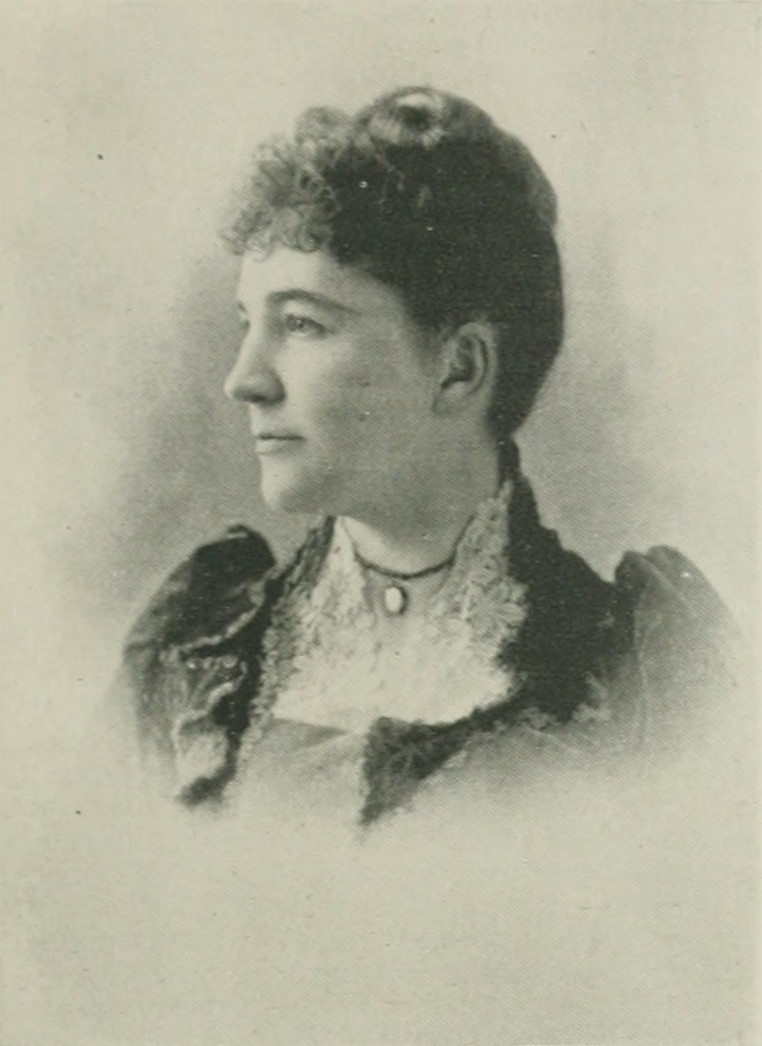
- Photo in A Woman of the Century
- Born: Mary Kavanaugh Oldham; February 4, 1854; Madison County, Kentucky
- Died: February 15, 1903 (aged 49)
- Occupations: church worker, social leader, editor
- Spouse: James Philip Eagle (m. 1882)

Mary Kavanaugh Eagle (née, Oldham; February 4, 1854 – February 15, 1903) was an American community leader, clubwoman, book editor, and activist in Protestant missionary work. She served as president of the Woman's Central Committee on Missions since 1882, and was the first president of the Woman's Mission Union, of Arkansas. As a member of the Board of Lady Managers of the World's Columbian Commission, and as chair of the Committee on Congresses, she was selected as editor of the papers read. Eagle served as First Lady of Arkansas during her husband James Philip Eagle's two terms as the state's 16th governor.

== Early years and education ==
Mary Kavanaugh Oldham was born in Madison County, Kentucky February 4, 1854. Both of her parents, William K. Oldham and J Kate Brown, were of Revolutionary ancestry. Her father, a leading stock-farmer in the Blue Grass region, was the son of Kie Oldham and Polly Kavanaugh and a native and resident of Madison county. He is of English descent on his paternal and Irish on his maternal side. Both his father's and mother's families were early settlers of central Kentucky and were among the most successful farmers and stock-dealers in that section. That vocation he also followed with marked success for many years. Her mother, who died 11 July 1880, was the daughter of Ira Brown and Frances Mullens, of Albemarle County, Virginia, and of Scotch-English heritage. She was a member of that family of Browns known as Brown's cove. Her uncle, Dr. Charles Brown, was a prominent physician of Albemarle County. Eagle's siblings included, sisters Mrs. W. H. Miller and Mrs. John Doty; and brothers, Dr. Ira B. Oldham, William Kavanaugh Oldham, Acting Governor of Arkansas in 1913, and Kie Oldham, Arkansas state senator.

Eagle was reared on her father's farm. Her early education was conducted mainly at home, her mother having selected the tutors and governesses for her three daughters. Eagle attended Mrs Julia A. Tivis's school, Science Hill, Shelbyville, Kentucky, where she distinguished herself in all her classes. She graduated from that institution in June, 1872. In August 1874, she united with the Viny Fork Missionary Baptist Church at Viny Fork, in Madison county. Kentucky, and became a zealous church worker.

== Career ==
She married James Philip Eagle January 3, 1882, and moved to his large cotton plantation in the upper Arkansas river bottom in Lonoke County, Arkansas, where he was engaged in farming. He was a devoted church man and as a member of the same denomination, they soon united their efforts in developing the interests of their church for home and foreign missions and for Christian and charitable work of various kinds. They were generous in their financial support of church work for many years. She was the leader of the woman's work of her denomination in Arkansas for more than eight years, serving as president of the Woman's Central Committee on Missions since its organization in November, 1882, and as president of the Woman's Mission Union of Arkansas. For many years, her husband was the president of the Southern Baptist Convention.

She spent the winter of 1885 in the city of Little Rock, Arkansas, her husband being a member of the General Assembly and Speaker of the House at that session. This caused Mrs. Eagle to take an interest in parliamentary practice and to take up that study, and she became one of the parliamentarians in the State. She accompanied him while he canvassed for the nomination for the office of governor in 1888, and during his canvass for re-election in 1890.

Eagle was prominent in club work, at the national and state levels. She was one of the founders of the Woman's Co-operative Association, a prominent member of the Aesthetic Club, was frequently a delegate at the Arkansas Federation of Women's Clubs, and was twice a delegate to the biennial conventions of the General Federation of Women's Clubs. She served as president of the missionary central committee of the church from 1882, and president of the state missionary union for a number of years. During her husband's two terms as governor, the executive mansion was known for the Southern hospitality she provided there.

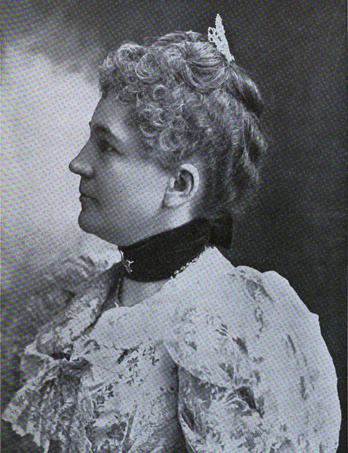
Mary Eagle, 1896

On the recommendation of Col. John D. Adams, democratic commissioner, Eagle was appointed as a member of the Board of Lady Managers of the World's Columbian Exposition. She came into national notice in this role, in 1893, as a member of the Board of Lady Managers and a chairwoman of the committee on congresses, in which capacity she presided over all the congresses held in the Woman's Building at the Chicago exposition. As the presiding office and parliamentarian, her decisions were seldom appealed. At the conclusion of the exposition, she was chosen to edit the many papers presented at the congresses, and the result of her work was the publication of two volumes of 824 pages, with the caption: "The Congress of Women, held in the Women's Building, World's Columbian Exposition, Chicago, United States of America, 1893, in two volumes, with portraits, biographies and addresses, published by authority of the board of lady managers, Mrs. Bertha Honore Palmer, president, edited b Mary Kavanaugh Oldham Eagle, Chairman of the committee on Congress of the Board of Lady Managers. W. B. Conkey, publisher, 1894".

== Death ==
She died February 15, 1903, and was buried at Mount Holly Cemetery, in Little Rock. Shortly thereafter, her husband published A brief memoir of Mary K. Eagle : with tributes from her friends (Little Rock, Press of Arkansas Democrat Company, 1903).

== Selected works ==
- The Congress of women held in the Woman's building, World's Columbian exposition, Chicago, U.S.A., 1893 : with portraits, biographies, and addresses, published by authority of the Board of lady managers, 1895
