= Ginger Beebe =

Former First Lady of Arkansas

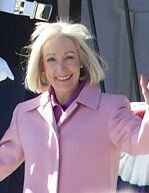

First Lady of Arkansas
- In role January 9, 2007 – January 13, 2015
- Governor: Mike Beebe
- Preceded by: Janet Huckabee
- Succeeded by: Susan Hutchinson

Personal details
- Born: September 3, 1949 (age 77)
- Spouse: Mike Beebe (m. 1979)
- Children: 3
- Education: Arkansas State University-Beebe; University of Central Arkansas

Ginger Kay Croom Beebe (born September 3, 1949) is an American activist and the wife of former Arkansas governor, Mike Beebe. She served as the first lady of Arkansas, from January 2007 until January 2015.

== Early life ==
Beebe was born on September 3, 1949, in Little Rock, Arkansas. She was adopted when she was four years old by Buell Croom, a wholesale distributor for Amoco Oil Company, and Virginia Croom, a homemaker. She was raised in Searcy, Arkansas and attended Searcy High School, where she was a member of the drill team and the choreography board. She attended Arkansas State University-Beebe and the University of Central Arkansas.

In 1968, she married David Powell Jr. and the couple lived in Dallas, Texas, while her husband attended mortuary school and then moved to Judsonia, Arkansas, and Searcy. They had two children, David Powell III and Tammy Powell. The couple divorced and Beebe met Mike Beebe, an attorney, while working with the Searcy Junior Auxiliary. They married in 1979. They had one son, named Kyle Houston Beebe.

== Activism ==
Beebe was the fortieth First Lady of Arkansas. While her husband was working as a politician, she began campaigning on the reform of mental health services. She was influenced by a family friend and her son-in-law dying by suicide in 2006. She was focused on removing the stigma and helping people access support. She worked with organizations, including Reading Is Fundamental, Reach Out and Read, Read Across America, Read for the Record, and Together We Read, to promote literacy. She also shared her travels with the Flat Stanley project. She volunteered for Beta Sigma Phi and Central Arkansas Hospital Auxiliary and served on the board of the CARTI foundation, the Women's Foundation of Arkansas, and the Arkansas Discovery Network. In 2011, she was named Woman of the Year by Women & Children First.

== Later life ==
Following her husband's retirement as governor in January 2015, the couple moved back to Searcy. Beebe has continued to work on advocacy and collaborate with other former first ladies of Arkansas on an exhibit at the Old State House Museum in Little Rock.

Honorary titles
Preceded by Janet Huckabee	First Lady of Arkansas; 2007–2015	Succeeded by Susan Hutchinson
