= Psalm 90 (Ives) =

Musical composition by Charles Ives, completed 1924

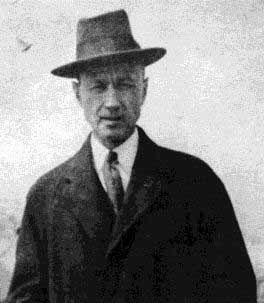
Charles Ives in 1913

Psalm 90 is a musical work by the American composer Charles Ives for choir, organ and bells. It was prepared and written over a period of three decades and completed in 1924. It is one of twelve Psalm-settings by Ives and was, according to his wife, the only one of his more than six hundred works with which he was fully satisfied.

== Text ==
This is the text as printed in the score (Ives 1970), taken from the King James version of the Bible, numbers indicate verses:

1. Lord, thou hast been our dwelling place from one generation to another.
2. Before the mountains were brought forth, or ever thou hadst formed the earth and the world, even from everlasting to everlasting, thou art God.
3. Thou turnest man to destruction; and sayest, "Return, ye children of men."
4. For a thousand years in thy sight are but as yesterday when it is past, and as a watch in the night.
5. Thou carriest them away as with a flood; they are as a sleep; in the morning they are like grass which groweth up.
6. In the morning it flourisheth and groweth up; in the evening it is cut down, and withereth.
7. For we are consumed by thine anger, and by thy wrath are we troubled.
8. Thou hast set our iniquities before thee, our secret sins in the light of thy countenance.
9. For all our days are passed away in thy wrath: we spend our years as a tale that is told.
10. The days of our years are threescore years and ten; and if by reason of strength they be fourscore years, yet is their strength labour and sorrow; for it is soon cut off, and we fly away.
11. Who knoweth the pow'r of thine anger? even according to thy fear, so is thy wrath.
12. So teach us to number our days, that we may apply our hearts unto wisdom.
13. Return, O Lord, how long? and let it repent thee concerning thy servants.
14. O satisfy us early with thy mercy; that we may rejoice and be glad all our days.
15. Make us glad according to the days wherein thou hast afflicted us, and the years wherein we have seen evil.
16. Let thy work appear unto thy servants, and thy glory unto their children.
17. And let the beauty of the Lord our God be upon us: and establish thou the work of our hands upon us; yea, the work of our hands establish thou it. Amen.

== Analysis ==
=== Verse 3 ===
The full chorus sings the first half of this verse ("Thou turnest man to destruction"). Beginning in unison, as a collective address from mankind to God, the chorus sings the first three words, but then splits apart into a series of cacophonous chords, as in the first verse (a device used frequently in this piece), to align with the text, "to destruction", which is repeated thrice (another thematic gesture), and accompanies the seeming destruction of harmonic convention. A tenor soloist takes the rest of the verse, "and sayest, 'Return, ye children of men.'" The solo voice is most appropriate here because it delineates the voice of God as singular (Spurgeon 1885) and separate from the mass and chaos of mankind.

=== Verse 4 ===
All four parts of the chorus sing entirely in unison for this whole verse, with the organ providing some supporting chords beneath along with the C pedal. The voices unison symbolizes the voices of humanity speaking together, in accord, acknowledging the eternity of God, as compared to the mortality of the individual (Spurgeon 1885).

=== Verse 12 ===
This short verse expresses man's submission, the consequent desire for peace with one's mortality, and a petition for God's help and guidance through the struggles of life (Spurgeon 1885).

=== Verse 13 ===
A soprano solo takes this verse, calling one's mind back to the third verse with its tenor solo. This solo strikes a similar chord with the tenor, as it begins with the word, "return", however, this time it is the people requesting God's return, rather than God mandating to them (Spurgeon 1885).

=== Verses 14–17 ===
These verses mark a transition into the last theme of the piece, introduced at the beginning, that of "Rejoicing in Beauty and Work". The tone and mood of the music shifts to a more serene, peaceful chorale, almost in unison. The church bells and gong return in the accompaniment, further transforming the previous tension and explosiveness of the previous verses into a blending, consonant prayer/resolution. The new tone assists in declaiming the text, as the psalm itself asks for satisfaction, peace, and due happiness as God sees fit to bestow. The psalm here accedes to God's power, stating the outright submission of the human soul to his will by referring to humans as "servants", and in this submission man hopes to achieve the beauty and salvation God offers to the faithful (Spurgeon 1885).

== Lasting impressions ==
According to Ives's wife, Harmony, his Psalm 90 was "the only one of his works that satisfied him" (Swafford 1998).
