= Austin McCormick =

American director and choreographer (born 1983)

Austin McCormick (born September 7, 1983) is an American director and choreographer. He is a graduate from the Juilliard School and The Conservatory of Baroque Dance and the artistic director/founder of Company XIV- a Neo-Baroque performance troupe fusing opera, circus, baroque dance, live music, burlesque and over-the-top design creating immersive productions. His work has been performed at the Kennedy Center, Lincoln Center's Peter Jay Sharp Theatre, The Metropolitan Opera, Alice Tully Hall, Clark Studio Theatre, Symphony Space, The Flea Theater, Alvin Ailey Dance Theatre, Walter Reade Theater, Mark Morris Dance Center, and internationally at Biblioteca Palafoxiana in Puebla, Mexico, The Roxy Art House in Edinburgh, Scotland, and Usine C in Montreal. His work has been seen at TED (conference), on VH1's NewNowNext Awards, and TLC's Cake Boss.

== Educational background ==
- Conservatory of Baroque Dance – Regine Astier, Director – Santa Barbara, California
- Harid Conservatory – Boca Raton, Florida
- University of North Carolina School of the Arts – Winston-Salem, North Carolina
- Juilliard School – Manhattan, New York City

== Awards and nominations ==
- Drama Desk Award – Best Choreography (Rococo Rouge, nomination 2015)
- Drama Desk Award – Unique Theatrical Experience (Nutcracker Rouge, nomination 2014)
- The Bessie Awards – Best light, set and costume design (Snow White, nomination 2011)
- Robert L.B. Tobin Director – designer Grant from Opera America (winner 2011)
- Innovative Theater Award – Outstanding Choreography/Movement (winner, 2009)
- Grand Jury Prize Dance on Camera Lincoln Center (nomination 2007)
- Susan Braun Award (winner 2006)

== Reviews ==
Roslyn Sulcas, from The New York Times, thought "Austin McCormick, who runs Company XIV, is a choreographer far less interested in the particularity of movement than in a rambunctious theatricality that deploys dance as part of a sexy, colorful mix of narrative and stage genres. His new “Lover. Muse. Mockingbird. Whore.” at the 303 Bond Street Theater is no different in that way from his “Judgment of Paris” or “Le Serpent Rouge!,” which riffed on various mythological figures and stories," and Leigh Witchel from dancelog.nyc thought, "McCormick’s bawdy court dances fit tongue-in-groove with Zimmerman’s vision. The dances reflected how modern audiences imagine the desires behind court dancing: a thin veneer of etiquette barely concealing a core of lust. Minuets degenerated quickly to missionary position. As the Prince sang a ravishing aria, McCormick had the couples do a slow, lascivious dance. Both choreographer and director were on the same page, viewing the structure of the court, its manners and even the Prince’s beautiful singing as a façade". His work has received acclaim from Bob Rizzo, who writes for The Dance Coach, "Nutcracker Rouge” is conceived, directed and choreographed by Drama Desk Award nominee Austin McCormick. His work is known for its unique mash- up of classical texts, dance, music, circus, opera, fashion and sumptuous design." Pia Catton, from Dance Magazine thought, "McCormick studied Baroque dance and incorporates it into his work. But this influence is subtle. What’s immediately clear is the range of dance that he has deftly woven together with concise spoken word and poignant music, from Arvo Pärt to Marlene Dietrich to Vivaldi. McCormick has a gift for understanding what captivates an audience—so much so that the show has a cinematic feel. That said, this piece is far better than a night at the movies."
