= Edmonton Opera =

Canadian opera company

Edmonton Opera is a professional Canadian opera company in Edmonton, Alberta. In the past the company regularly presented performances at the Northern Alberta Jubilee Auditorium, but in recent years has branched out to perform at a variety of stages throughout Edmonton. The Edmonton Opera office is home to a box office, production space, and costume workshop.

== History ==
Edmonton Opera was founded by Jean Létourneau in 1963. Approximately six amateur opera companies pre-date the Edmonton Opera's founding. After Mrs. J.B. Carmichael's death in 1964, singers who had been involved with the Edmonton Operatic Society approached local pianist and voice teacher Jean Letourneau about working with them. After a number of successful productions, the group changed its name to the Edmonton Professional Opera Association, with David Ker as the first president and Letourneau as the music director. "Professional" was dropped from the company's name in August 1966, as the then-artistic director, Irving Guttman, argued that it should be obvious to all if a company is professional.

The first season, 1963/64, featured two productions: Madama Butterfly in October 1963, and Cavalleria Rusticana and Pagliacci in April 1964.

In 1966, Letourneau convinced Guttman, then artistic director of Vancouver Opera, to also work with Edmonton Opera, where he served as artistic director from 1966 to 1998. Guttman was also founding artistic director of Saskatchewan Opera, artistic director of Manitoba Opera, and artistic advisor to Calgary Opera, holding many of these posts simultaneously. As a result of his formative influence on these companies he became known as the Father of Opera in Western Canada.

Until 2008, the opera guild was one of many forms of support for the opera. Founded by Thelma Gregg, the group held many successful fundraisers and ensured everyone backstage was well-fed.

Since 2021, under the leadership of Artistic Director Joel Ivany, Edmonton Opera has pursued a programming model that balances traditional repertoire with contemporary reimaginings, interdisciplinary collaboration, and new Canadian work. The company has expanded partnerships with organizations including the Edmonton Symphony Orchestra and Citadel Theatre, while also increasing investment in community engagement, artist development, and alternative performance formats. During this period, Edmonton Opera presented productions such as Wagner’s Die Walküre and Siegfried in chamber arrangements by Jonathan Dove, as well as new and immersive works including Orphée+.

Ivany’s tenure has also emphasized the development of emerging Canadian artists and broader audience access initiatives. The company expanded its Emerging Artist program through partnerships with institutions such as the National Arts Centre and the Yukon Arts Centre, while introducing increased community programming, donor events, and performances in non-traditional spaces. Edmonton Opera’s strategic direction during this period focused on positioning opera as a contemporary and evolving art form within the cultural life of Edmonton.

In 2023, Edmonton Opera announced the appointment of Canadian conductor Simon Rivard as their first music director. Prior to this, Rivard appeared as a guest conductor for their 2022 productions of Puccini's Tosca and La bohème.

== Production history ==
The number of productions each year varies from two operas to as many as five, although five operas have been presented only twice in the company's history, in 1992/93 and 1993/94.

Repertoire includes the classic operatic works, as well as a handful of more contemporary pieces, especially in more recent years.

The production history below, though incomplete, is based on a timetoast page hosted by the company.

Production History
Season	Production Name	Dates	Notes
1963/64	Madama Butterfly	Oct 1963	
	Cavalleria Rusticana and I Pagliacci	Apr 1964	
1964/65	Rigoletto	Oct 1964	
	Carmen	Apr 1965	
1965/66	La Traviata	Oct 965	
	La Bohéme	May 1966	
1966/67	Tosca	Oct 1966	
	Faust	Jan 1967	
1967/68	Barber of Seville	Nov 1967	
	La Traviata	Apr 1968	
1968/69	Carmen	Oct 1968	
	Lucia di Lammermoor	Jan 1969	
	The Consul	Apr 1969	
1970	La Bohéme	Jan 1970	
	Rigoletto	Apr 1970	
1970/71	Il Trovatore	Nov 1970	
	Madama Butterfly	Feb 1971	
	Les contes d'Hoffmann	Apr 1971	
1971/72	Un Ballo in Maschera	Oct 1971	
	The Marriage of Figaro	Feb 1972	
	Aida	Apr 1972	
1972/73	Lucrezia Borgia	Nov 1972	
	Tosca	Feb 1973	
	Montserrat Cabell in Concert	Mar 1973	
	Cavalleria Rusticana and I Pagliacci	Apr 1973	
1973/74	Faust	Nov 1973	
	La Traviata	Jan 1974	
	Turandot	Mar 1974	
1975/75	Carmen	Oct 1974	
	The Merry Widow	Jan 1975	
	Manon Lescaut	Mar 1975	
1975/76	Die Fledermaus	Sep 1975	
	Norma	Nov 1975	
	Cosi fan tutte	Feb 1976	
	La Bohéme	Apr 1976	
1976/77	Barber of Seville	Sep 1976	
	Madama Butterfly	Dec 1976	
	Salome	Feb 1977	
	Daughter of the Regiment	May 1977	
1977/78	The Mikado	Sep 1977	
	Leotyne Price in Recital	Nov 1977	
	Don Giovanni	Dec 1977	
	Il Trovatore	Feb 1978	
	Atilla	Apr 1978	
1978/79	Tosca	Nov 1978	
	Macbeth	Feb 1979	
	Lucia di Lammermoor	Apr 1979	
1979/80	Rigoletto	Sep 1979	
	Der Fliegende Hollander	Nov 1979	
	The Most Happy Fella	Jan 1980	
	Manon	Jan 1980	
	Aida	May 1980	
1980/1981	South Pacific	Sep 1980	
	Otello	Nov 1980	
	Cavalleria Rusticana and I Pagliacci	Mar 1981	
	Nabucco	May 1981	
1981/82	Turnadot	Oct 1981	
	Carmen	Mar 1982	
	The Masked Ball	May 1982	
1982/83	La Traviata	Nov 1982	
	The Tales of Hoffmann	Feb 1983	
	Il Puritani	Mar 1983	
1983/84	Lucia di Lammermoor	Oct 1983	
	Lohengrin	Nov 1983	
	The Gondoliers	Dec 1983	
	Norma	Jan 1984	
	La Bohéme	Mar 1984	
	Faust	Mar 1984	
1984/85	Il Trovatore	Sep 1984	
	The Marriage of Figaro	Nov 1984	
	Die Fledermaus	Jan 1985	
1985/86	Madama Butterfly	Sep 1985	
	The Barber of Seville	Nov 1985	
	Christmas with the Edmonton Opera	Dec 1985	
	Coward à la carte - New Years	Dec 1985	
	The Magic Flute	Jan 1986	
	The Merry Widow	Mar 1986	
1986/87	Gilbert & Sullivan Opera and Dance	Sep 1986	
	Rigoletto	Oct 1986	
	Cosi fan tutte	Nov 1986	
	Salome	Jan 1987	
	Tosca	May 1987	
1987/88	La Traviata	Sep 1987	
	Don Giovanni	Nov 1987	
	Pirates of Penzance	Jan 1988	
	Manon Lescaut	Mar 1988	
1988/89	Romeo et Juliette	Nov 1988	
	Carmen	Jan 1989	
	L'elisir d'amore	Mar 1989	
	Aida	May 1989	
1989/90	La Bohéme	Sep 1989	
	The Dialogues of the	Nov 1989	
	Die Fledermaus	Jan 1990	
	The Flying Dutchman	Mar 1990	
1990/91	Madama Butterfly Benefit Fashion Show	Oct 1990	
	A Masked Ball	Nov 1990	
	Eugene Onegin	Jan 1991	
	The Marriage of Figaro	Mar 1991	
	Madama Butterfly	May 1991	
	Irving Guttman Tribute	May 1991	
1991/92	The Mikado	Nov 1991	
	The Barber of Seville	Jan 1992	
	Adriadne auf Naxos	Mar 1992	
	La Traviata	Apr 1992	
1992/93	Don Pasquale	Nov 1992	
	The Magic Flute	Jan 1993	
	Turn of the Screw	Mar 1993	
	Porgy and Bess	Mar 1993	
	Tosca	May 1993	
1993/94	The Pearl Fishers	Sep 1993	
	La Bohéme	Nov 1993	
	Jenufa	Jan 1994	
	June Anderson Recital	Feb 1994	
	Julius Caesar	Mar 1994	
	Rigoletto	May 1994	
	Kiri Te Kanawa in Recital	May 1994	
1994/95	Don Giovanni	Oct 1994	
	The Rape of Lucrezia	Jan 1995	
	La Cenerentola	Mar 1995	
	Carmen	May 1995	
1995/96	Cecilia Bartoli in Recital	Sep 1995	
	Turandot	Nov 1995	
	Lucia di Lammermoor	Jan 1996	
	Die Fledermaus	Mar 1996	
	A Gala Tribute to Irving Guttman	May 1996	
1996/97	Nabucco	Nov 1996	
	The Abduction from the Seraglio	Feb 1997	
	Madama Butterfly	Mar 1997	
	Daughter of the Regiment	Apr 1997	
1997/98	Romeo et Juliette	Nov 1997	
	The Barber of Seville	Jan 1998	
	H.M.S Pinafore	Mar 1998	
	Il Trovatore	May 1998	
	Denyce Graves in Recital	May 1998	
1998/99	The Marriage of Figaro	Nov 1998	
	La Bohéme	Jan 1999	
	The Elixir of Love	Mar 1999	
	The Tales of Hoffmann	Apr 1999	
1999/00	Aida	Nov 1999	
	The Pirates of Panzance	Jan 2000	
	The Rake's Progress	Mar 2000	
	Tosca	April 2000	
2000/01	Hansel and Gretel	Nov 2000	
	Cosi fan tutte	Feb 2001	
	Carmen	Mar 2001	
2001/02	Rigoletto	Oct 2001	
	The Magic Flute	Nov 2001	
	Of Mice and Men	Mar 2002	
	The Merry Widow	Apr 2002	
2002/03	Cavalleria Rusticana and I Pagliacci	Oct 2002	
	Don Pasquale	Nov 2002	
	The Mikado	Feb 2003	
	Some Enchanted Evening	Mar 2003	
2003/04	Turnadot	Nov 2003	
	Madama Butterfly	Mar 2004	
	South Pacific	Apr 2004	
2004/05	Lakme	Oct 2004	
	The Emperor of Atlantis	Nov 2004	
	Sallyy Dibblee in Recital	Mar 2005	
	Porgy and Bess	May 2005	
2005/06	Launch of the Opera coat Project	Oct 2005	
	Gala Bohéme	Nov 2005	
	Filumena	Nov 2005	
	Bluebeard's Castle & Erwartung	Feb 2006	
	La Bohéme	Mar 2006	
2006/07	Don Giovanni	Nov 2006	
	The Barber of Seville	Feb 2007	
	Macbeth	Apr 2007	
2007/08	Carmen	Oct 2007	
	H.M.S. Pinafore	Feb 2008	
	Requiem	Apr 2008	
	Falstaff	Apr 2008	
2008/09	The Flying Dutchman	Oct 2008	
	Daughter of the Regiment	Feb 2009	
	The Pearl Fishers	Mar 2009	
	La Traviata	Apr 2009	
2009/10	Rigoletto	Oct 2009	
	The Seven Deadly Sins and Songs of a Wayfarer	April 2010	
	Otello	Apr 2010	
2010/11	La Bohéme	Oct 2010	
	Valentine's Gala	Feb 2011	
	The Abduction from the Seraglio	Feb 2011	
2011/12	Cavalleria Rusticana and I Pagliacci	Oct 2011	
	The Mikado	Feb 2012	
	Fidelio	April 2012	
2012/13	Aida	Oct 2012	
	The Tales of Hoffmann	Feb 2013	
	Eugene Onegin	Apr 2013	
2013/14	Salome	Oct 2013	
	Die Fledermaus	Feb 2014	
	Madama Butterfly	Apr 2014	
2014/15	The Barber of Seville	Oct 2014	
	The Magic Flute	Jan 2015	
	Lucia di Lammermoor	Apr 2015	
2015/16	The Merry Widow	Oct 2015	
	Carmen	Jan 2016	
	Mary Stuart	April 2016	
2016/17	Turandot	Oct 2016	
	Cinderella	Feb 2017	
	Elektra	Mar 2017	
2017/18	Lilies (Les Feluettes)	Oct 2017	
2018/19			
2019/20			
2020/21			
2021/22			
2022/23	Tosca	Oct 2022	
	Orphée+	Jan 2023	
	Stabat Mater	Mar 2023	
2023/24	Carmen	Oct 2023	
	Don Giovanni	Feb 2024	
	Ayre	Apr 2024	
	Das Rheingold (Jonathan Dove arrangement)	May 2024	
2024/25	Die Fledermaus	Nov 2024	
	Bluebeard's Castle	Feb 2025	
	Die Walküre (Jonathan Dove arrangement)	Jun 2025	
2025/26	Bravi! Opera's Greatest Hits	Oct 2025	
	Indians on Vacation (Cancelled)	Feb 2026	
	Siegfried (Jonathan Dove arrangement)	May 2026	

== Education ==
With the aid of technology, the company is able to share operatic resources across northern Alberta, including educational guides, programs and other resources. Field trips for students in Edmonton are arranged for the second dress rehearsal, when they can visit the Northern Alberta Jubilee, watch the performance, and often, chorus and cast members come out to the lobby to chat during intermissions.

Between 1973 and 1984, Edmonton Opera on Tour brought opera to children in schools across Alberta, from bigger centres such as Grande Prairie to smaller communities such as Holden. Through this program, there were approximately 200 performances per year.

== Community ==
The Edmonton Opera has partnered with many other arts organizations in Edmonton, including the Alberta Craft Council and the Shumka Ukrainian Dancers. The Edmonton Opera is also the largest employer of the Edmonton Symphony Orchestra.
