= Jean Létourneau (musician) =

Jean Létourneau (12 April 1921 – 20 August 2018, Lévis) was a Canadian operatic tenor, french horn player, opera director, choral conductor, and music educator. He founded the Edmonton Opera in 1963, and served as that organization's first artistic director for three years.

== Life and career ==
Jean Létourneau was born in Quebec City on 12 April 1921. He was the son the pianist, organist, and conductor Omer Létourneau. He began his musical training with his father, and later studied french horn with Raoul Vézina and singing with Émile Larochelle and Léon Rothier. He won a voice scholarship to the Royal Conservatory of Music (RCM) where he was a pupil of baritone George Lambert. He graduated from the RCM in 1945, and that same year married the soprano and pianist Kathleen Busby.

From 1945 to 1948 Létourneau worked as a french horn player in the Quebec Symphony Orchestra and the Royal 22nd Regiment Band. He concurrently worked as a tenor on the radio, as an oratorio soloist, and a recitalist; including appearing as a soloist with the Toronto Symphony Orchestra and singing the part of the Evangelist in annual presentations of Bach's St Matthew Passion with conductor Ernest MacMillan. From 1948 to 1951 he was employed as a singer in the ensemble at Radio City Music Hall in New York City. He was active as an opera singer and oratorio soloist in Canada.

Létourneau began producing operas in the city of Edmonton in 1956. He founded the Edmonton Opera in 1963; serving as the company's first artistic director until 1966. He taught on the music faculties of the University of Alberta (1972-1979) and the University of Victoria (1979-1986). He was particularly celebrated for his work as a voice teacher.
