= Walter W. Rose =

American politician and real estate developer

Walter W. Rose was an American politician and real estate developer in Florida. He served in the Florida Senate including as President of the Florida Senate. He was a Democrat.

Rose moved to Florida in 1909. He bought the Ericsson house in 1920. He platted the Rosemere subdivision in Orlando's College Park subdivision and donated land for what is now Dickson Azalea Park along Fern Creek. Rose named the streets in the area he platted for colleges.

He served in the State Senate from 1933 until 1948 as a Democrat.
