= First ladies and gentlemen of Arkansas =

Hostess of the Arkansas Governor's Mansion

First Gentleman of Arkansas
- Seal of Arkansas

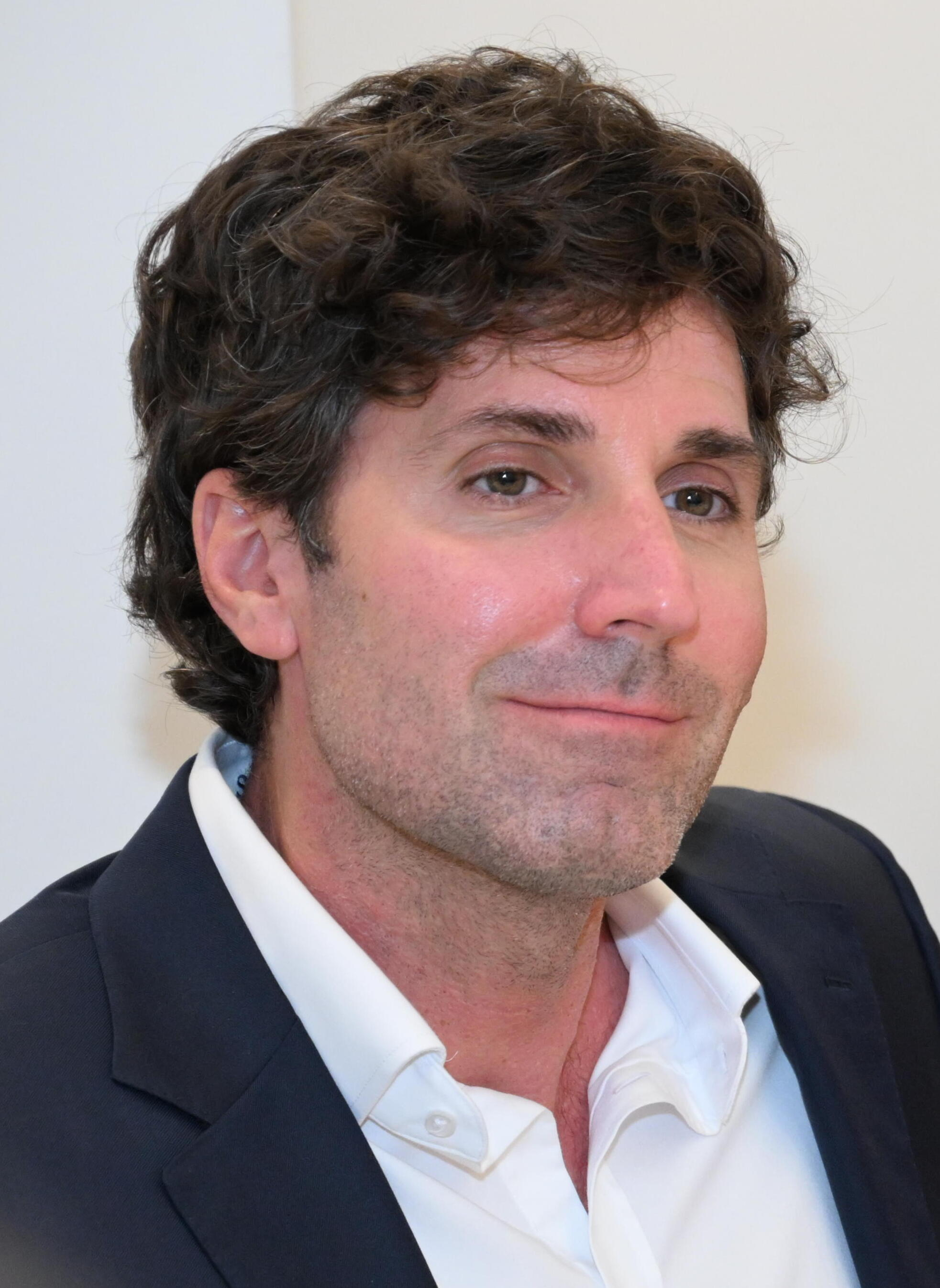
- Current; Bryan Sanders since January 10, 2023
- Style: Mr. Sanders; Mr. First Gentleman
- Residence: Governor's Mansion
- Inaugural holder: Martha Ferguson
- Formation: March 10, 1821 (205 years ago)
- Website: Official website

The first lady or first gentleman of Arkansas is the title held by the host of the Arkansas Governor's Mansion, usually the spouse of the governor of Arkansas, concurrent with the governor's term in office.

A governor's mansion was built during Anne McMath's tenure and overseeing it became a responsibility of the first spouse. Bryan Sanders is the current first gentleman of Arkansas, having been in the role since January 10, 2023, as the husband of Governor Sarah Huckabee Sanders. He is also the first male spouse of the governor of Arkansas.

The exhibition "First Ladies of Arkansas: Women of Their Times" was held at the Old State House Museum.

== Role ==
The position of the first spouse is not an elected one, carries no official duties, and receives no salary. However, the first spouse holds a highly visible position in the state government. The first spouse is the host of the Arkansas Governor's Mansion and organizes and attends official ceremonies and functions of state either along with, or in place of, the governor.

It is common for the governor's spouse to select specific, non-political, causes to promote.

== First ladies and gentlemen of Arkansas ==
- Frances Watkins Walton Pope (1829-1835)
- Mary Kavanaugh Eagle (1889-1893), husband of James Philip Eagle
- Elizabeth Little (1907-1909), lived from April 3, 1861 and died on September 15, 1953
- Louvenia Wallace Donaghey (1909-1913)
- Ewilda Robinson (1913)
- Ida Virginia Yarborough Hays (1913–1917)
- Anne Brough (1917-1921) (Anne Wade Roark Brough)
- Eula Terral
- Mabel Martineau (1927-1928)
- Anne McMath (1949-1953), wife of Sid Sanders McMath
- Margaret Cherry (1953–1955)
- Alta Faubus (1955-1967), wife of Orval Faubus (Celia Alta Faubus)
- Jeannette Rockefeller (1967–1971)
- Betty Bumpers (1971–1975)
- Barbara Pryor (1975–1979)
- Hillary Clinton (1979–1981, 1983–1992)
- Gay White (1981–1983)
- Betty Tucker (1992–1996)
- Janet Huckabee (1996–2007)
- Ginger Beebe (2007–2015)
- Susan Burrell Hutchinson (2015–2023), wife of Asa Hutchinson
- Bryan Sanders (2023–present)

== Gallery ==
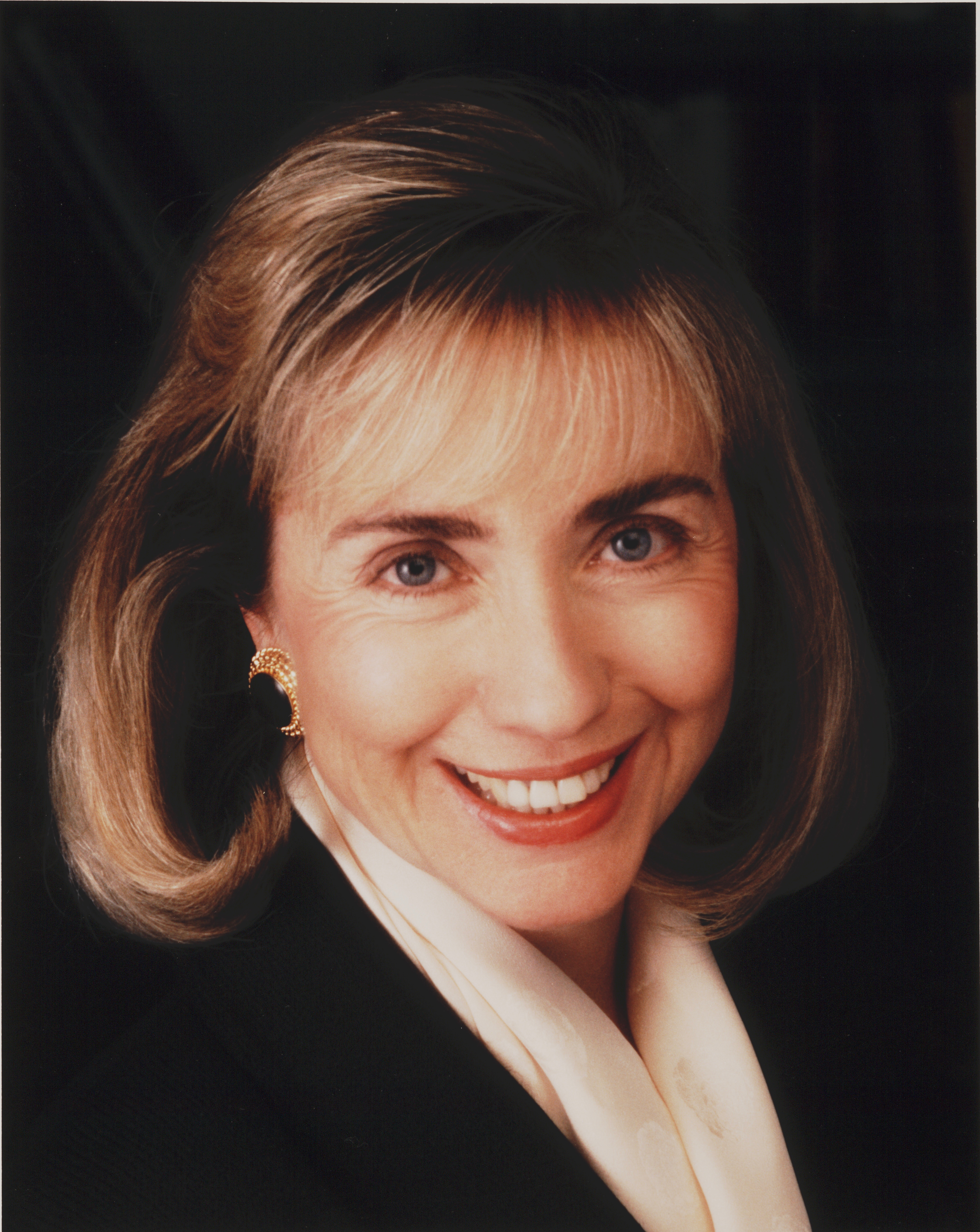
Hillary Clinton

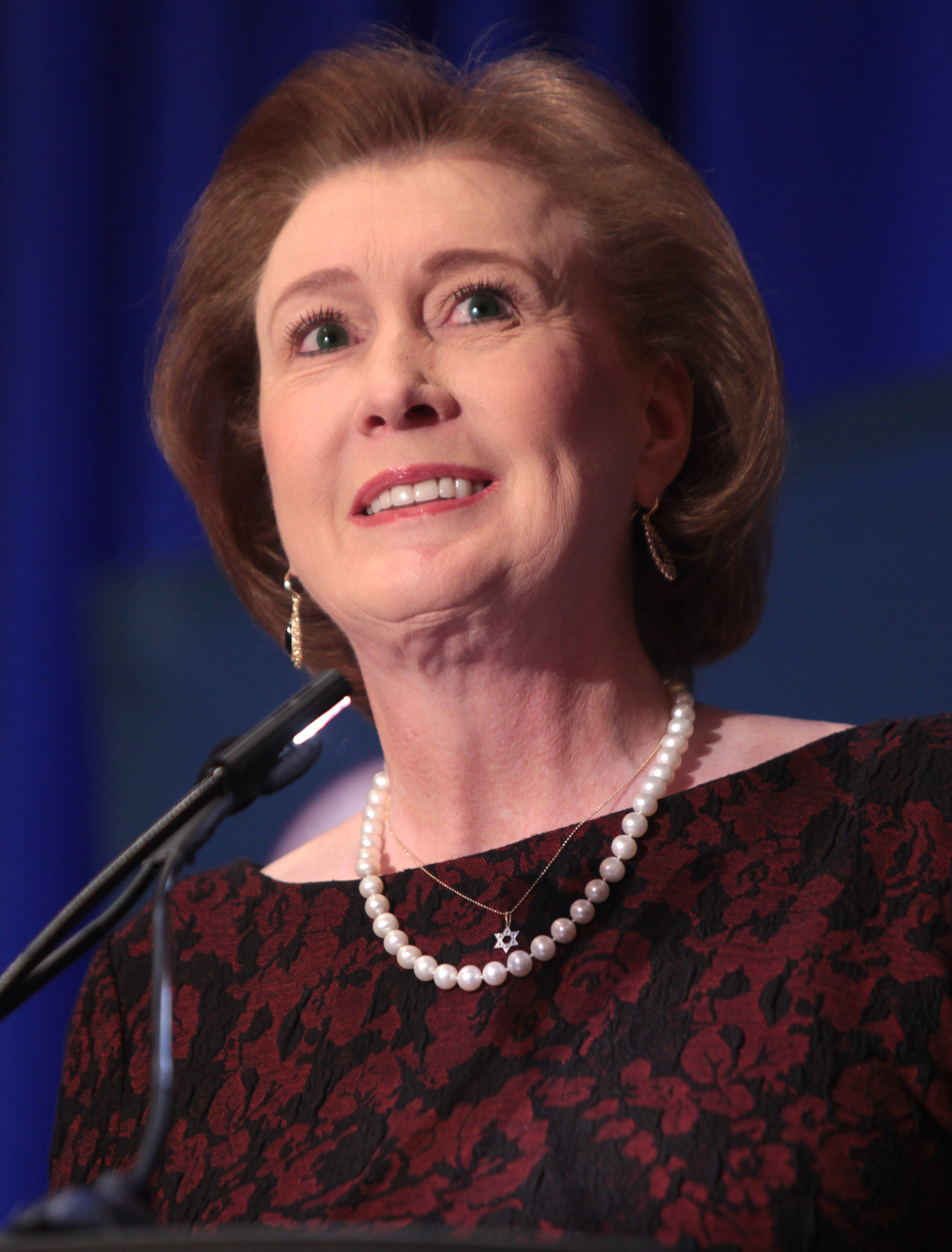
Janet Huckabee

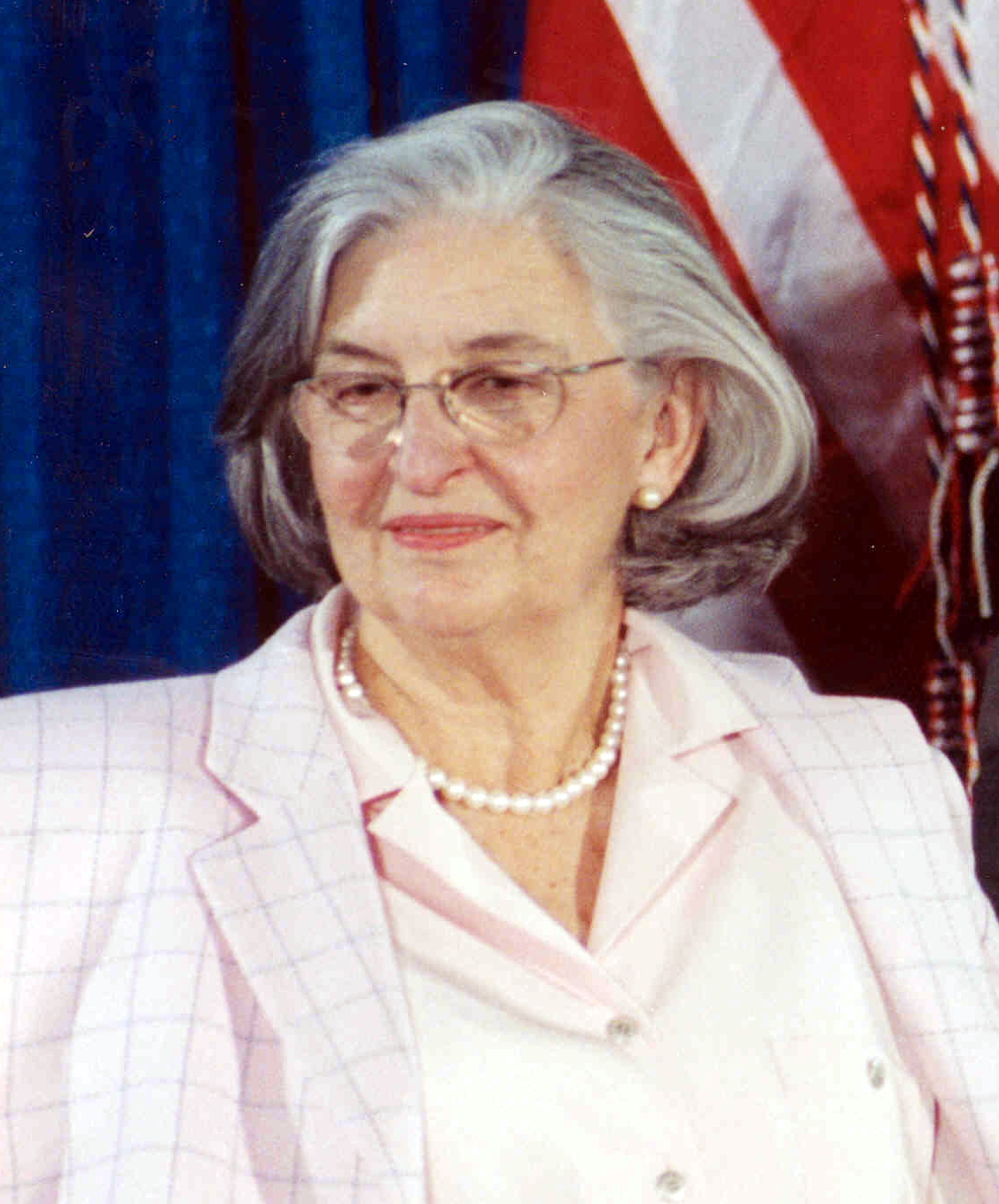
Betty Bumpers

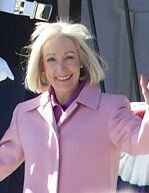
Ginger Beebe

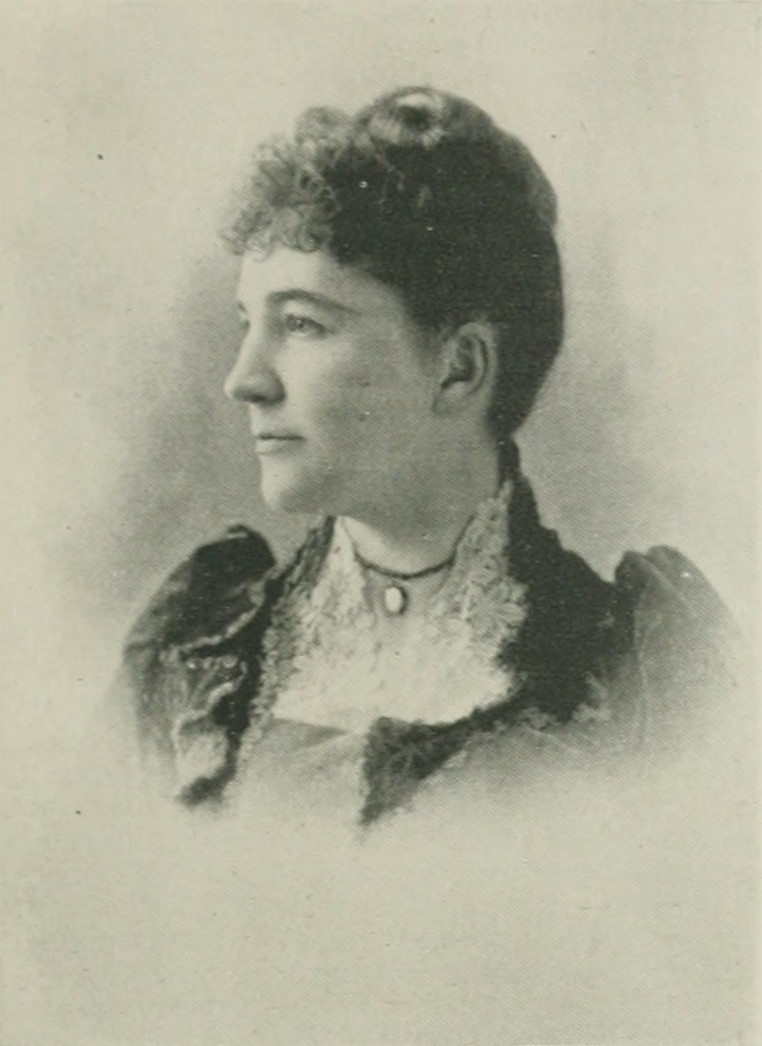
Mary Kavanaugh Eagle

== See also ==
- List of current United States first spouses
