= Kentucky Department of Education =

Government agency

Agency overview
- Formed: 1924; 102 years ago
- Jurisdiction: Commonwealth of Kentucky
- Agency executive: Dr. Robbie Fletcher, Commissioner of Education
- Website: https://education.ky.gov/Pages/default.aspx

The Kentucky Department of Education (KYDOE) is an agency within the government of Kentucky that is responsible for regulating education in the state.

== History ==
The Kentucky Department of Education became an official organization in 1924. Its headquarters is located in Frankfort, Kentucky.

In 1848, Kentucky citizens voted for a law that allowed taxation to support schools. In 1938, a new law was passed allowing vocational-technical schools to be formed. In 1956, vocational-technical schools were expanded to help those who were blind, with a focus on providing training and jobs for the visually impaired. The vocational schools became controlled, like other public schools in the state, by the Department of Education in 1962. The Kentucky Education Reform Act (KERA) became a law in 1990, and is enforced by the Kentucky Department of Education. KRS 159.010 is a Kentucky law that requires children aged between 6 and 16 to attend school. This law was modified by a 2013 Senate bill, raising the mandatory attendance age to 18 beginning in the 2015–2016 school year. The Department of Education partners with the School Improvement Network to use programs such as PD 360 and Common Core 360 to educate students.

== Kentucky Board of Education ==
The Kentucky Board of Education (KBE) was established 1838. The board consisted ex officio members with limited ability to function effectively as the members had other responsibilities within the state. The board's powers, at that time, included creating laws, establishing a course of study and choosing course texts, and control of funds and property. The Board of Education is responsible for granting certificates for high school graduates and teacher training.

The Kentucky Board of Education consists of 11 members. The governor of Kentucky appoints the members, and they are confirmed by both the state House of Representatives and the Senate. The board members political affiliation is not considered in appointments. Board members must be at least 30 years old, have an associates degree or higher, and lived in Kentucky for at least three years. Each member serves for four years. Today the board's primary purpose is to make and adopt regulations and policies.

The state Board of Education has power over all of the schools in the state. Local boards of education have power over each of the schools located within its district. Each district board deals with issues that are of interest to the district.

There have been conflicts between the Board of Education and the Department of Education. The Kentucky Department of Education has jurisdiction over county boards. In November 2015 the Knox County Board of Education was investigated by the Kentucky Department of Education for violating Kentucky laws such as including personal matters in district rules that disrupt operations and providing free resources to independent schools.

== Leadership ==
=== Superintendent of Public Instruction ===
The 1838 law that established the Kentucky Board of Education also called for the governor to appoint a superintendent of public instruction to serve for a two-year term. Upon the ratification of the 1850 Kentucky constitution, the superintendent was made a constitutional officer elected to a four-year term. When the 1891 Kentucky constitution was ratified, like other constitutional officers, the superintendent was limited to serve only nonconsecutive, four-year terms. With the passage of KERA in 1990, nearly all of the superintendent's duties and authority were delegated to a newly created position known as the Commissioner of Education. Finally, in 1992 the office was formally abolished by a constitutional amendment passed by ballot referendum.

Notable superintendents included Joseph J. Bullock, Benjamin Bosworth Smith, Robert Jefferson Breckenridge, John Grant Crabbe, Robert R. Martin, and James B. Graham.

=== Commissioner of Education ===
Following the transfer of authority and eventual abolishment of the office of Superintendent of Public Instruction, the Kentucky Commissioner of Education was made the chief state school officer. Until 2023, the Kentucky Board of Education directly appointed the commissioner typically following a search and interview process. With the passage of Senate Bill 107 during the 2023 Kentucky General Assembly, the commissioner would require the recommendation of the KBE as well as confirmation by the Kentucky Senate.

The current commissioner is Dr. Robbie Fletcher.

Kentucky Commissioners of Education
#	Name	Tenure
1.	Thomas C. Boysen	1991–1995
2.	Wilmer St. Clair Cody	1995–1999
-	Kevin Nolan (interim)	1999–2001
3.	Gene Wilhoit	2001–2007
4.	Jon Draud	2007–2009
-	Elaine Farris (interim)	2009
5.	Terry Holliday	2009–2015
-	Kevin C. Brown (interim)	2015
6.	Stephen L. Pruitt	2015–2018
-	Wayne Lewis (interim)	2018
7.	Wayne Lewis	2018–2019
-	Kevin C. Brown (interim)	2019–2020
8.	Jason Glass	2020–2023
-	Robin Kinney Fields (interim)	2023–2024
9.	Robbie Fletcher	2024–present

=== Other ===
Other positions include a deputy commissioner and secretary. There are multiple assistant superintendent positions focused on instruction, rehabilitation services, vocational education, pupil personnel services, instruction, administration, finance, state relations, and federal relations.

== See also ==
- Kentucky government
- List of Counties in Kentucky
- List of School Districts in Kentucky
- Kentucky Education Reform Act
