= Helen Burbank =

American politician (1898–1981)

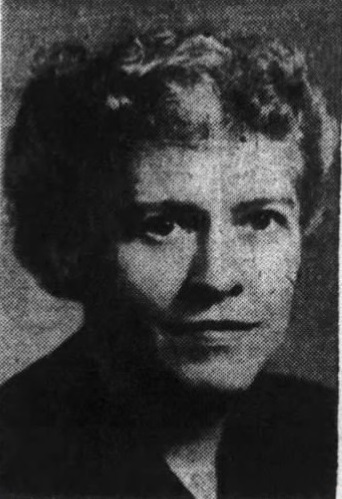
Rutland Herald, October 16, 1947

Helen E. Burbank (July 27, 1898 – February 22, 1981) was a career public servant in Vermont. She was the longtime Deputy Secretary of State, and served for over a year as Secretary of State of Vermont after she was appointed to fill a vacancy.

== Biography ==
Helen Elizabeth Burbank was born in Otego, New York on July 27, 1898, the daughter of Horace J. Burbank (1869-1914) and Edith L. Wicks (1866-1950). She was raised in Vermont, and graduated from St. Johnsbury Academy.

Burbank was initially employed in the office of the Vermont Commissioner of Industries. During World War I, Burbank was the personal assistant for the Vermont director of the United States Employment Service. After the war, she was employed at a Montpelier insurance agency, and then returned to the Vermont Commissioner of Industries's office as a stenographer.

In August 1920, Burbank accepted a position in the office of the Secretary of State of Vermont. In 1927, the incumbent Secretary, Rawson C. Myrick, appointed her as his deputy. Burbank served as Deputy Secretary of State until 1947.

In August, 1947, Myrick resigned. Ernest W. Gibson Jr., then serving as Governor of Vermont, requested that Burbank continue the functions of the secretary's office while remaining as deputy; she agreed. In October, Gibson appointed Burbank to fill the Secretary's position, and she served until January, 1949. Burbank spent several weeks in the hospital at the end of 1947 and beginning of 1948, and declined to be a candidate for Secretary of State in the 1948 election.

In 1948, Republican Howard E. Armstrong ran successfully for Secretary of State. Upon succeeding Burbank in January, 1949, Armstrong reappointed Burbank as Deputy Secretary of State. She continued to serve as deputy until December, 1965.

In 1964, Harry H. Cooley was elected as part of that year's nationwide Democratic landslide and became the first Democrat to win the Secretary of State's post. He took office in January, 1965; in December, he decided to employ a deputy of his own choosing, and relieved Burbank of her duties. She was subsequently employed by the Vermont Legislative Council. Burbank was mentioned as a candidate for Secretary of State in 1966; she remained active in Republican politics as a local and county committee member and delegate to party conventions, but made no effort to run.

In 1968, Republican Richard C. Thomas won the Secretary of State's position. He employed Armstrong and Burbank on a consulting basis at the start of his eight-year tenure.

== Death and burial ==
In retirement, Burbank continued to reside in Montpelier. She died in Berlin on February 22, 1981. Burbank was buried at Mount Pleasant Cemetery in St. Johnsbury.

== Sources ==
=== Books ===
- American Women: The Official Who's Who Among the Women of the Nation. Vol. 1–3. Los Angeles, CA: Richard Blank Publishing Company. 1935. p. 127.

=== Newspapers ===
- "Local News: Montpelier". Burlington Free Press. Burlington, VT. October 12, 1918. p. 3.
- "St. Johnsbury Locals". St. Johnsbury Caledonian. St. Johnsbury, VT. October 15, 1919. p. 4.
- "Happenings in Vermont". Burlington Free Press. Burlington, VT. August 12, 1920. p. 10.
- "Names Woman Deputy: Myrick Appoints Helen Burbank Deputy Secretary of State". Burlington Free Press. Burlington, VT. May 13, 1927. p. 2.
- "Miss Burbank Named Vermont's First Woman Secretary of State". Burlington Free Press. Burlington, VT. October 16, 1947. p. 2.
- "Miss Burbank Returning from Boston Hospital Today". Burlington Free Press. Burlington, VT. Morning Press Bureau. December 9, 1947. p. 4.
- "Secretary of State Burbank Back at Desk in Capitol". Burlington Free Press. Burlington, VT. Morning Press Bureau. January 13, 1948. p. 8.
- "Helen Burbank Not to Run for State Secretary". Burlington Free Press. Burlington, VT. Morning Press Bureau. February 25, 1948. p. 10.
- "Vt. Legislative Council to Hold Clinic Monday". Burlington Free Press. Burlington, VT. November 6, 1948. p. 4.
- "Howard Armstrong Sworn In As New Secretary of State". Burlington Free Press. Burlington, VT. January 7, 1949. p. 2.
- "Cooley Given Firsthand Look at New Job". Burlington Free Press. Burlington, VT. November 10, 1964. p. 18.
- "Miss Jeanne Rousse Succeeds Helen Burbank as Deputy". Bennington Banner. Bennington, VT. December 14, 1965. p. 5.
- "State Luncheon Planned by GOP Women". Burlington Free Press. Burlington, VT. February 4, 1966. p. 6.
- "For Secretary of State: Backing for Helen Burbank is Reported Gaining Support". Burlington Free Press. Burlington, VT. March 10, 1966. p. 8.
- "The Vermont Free Press: Questions and Answers". Burlington Free Press. Burlington, VT. March 6, 1967. p. 7.
- "Two Former Secretaries of State May Aid Thomas". Burlington Free Press. Burlington, VT. Free Press Capitol Bureau. November 14, 1968. p. 15.
- "Ex-Secretary of State Helen Burbank Dies". Burlington Free Press. Burlington, VT. February 24, 1981. p. 4.

=== Internet ===
- "Vermont Death Index, 1981-2001, Entry for Helen E. Burbank". Ancestry.com. Provo, UT: Ancestry.com, LLC.

Political offices
Preceded by Rawson C. Myrick	Secretary of State of Vermont; 1947–1949	Succeeded by Howard E. Armstrong
