= MUHS =

MUHS is a four-letter acronym, and may refer to:

- Marquette University High School, Milwaukee, Wisconsin, United States
- Maharashtra University of Health Sciences, Nashik, India
- Middlebury Union High School, Middlebury, Vermont, United States
