= Byron Sunderland =

American Presbyterian minister and author

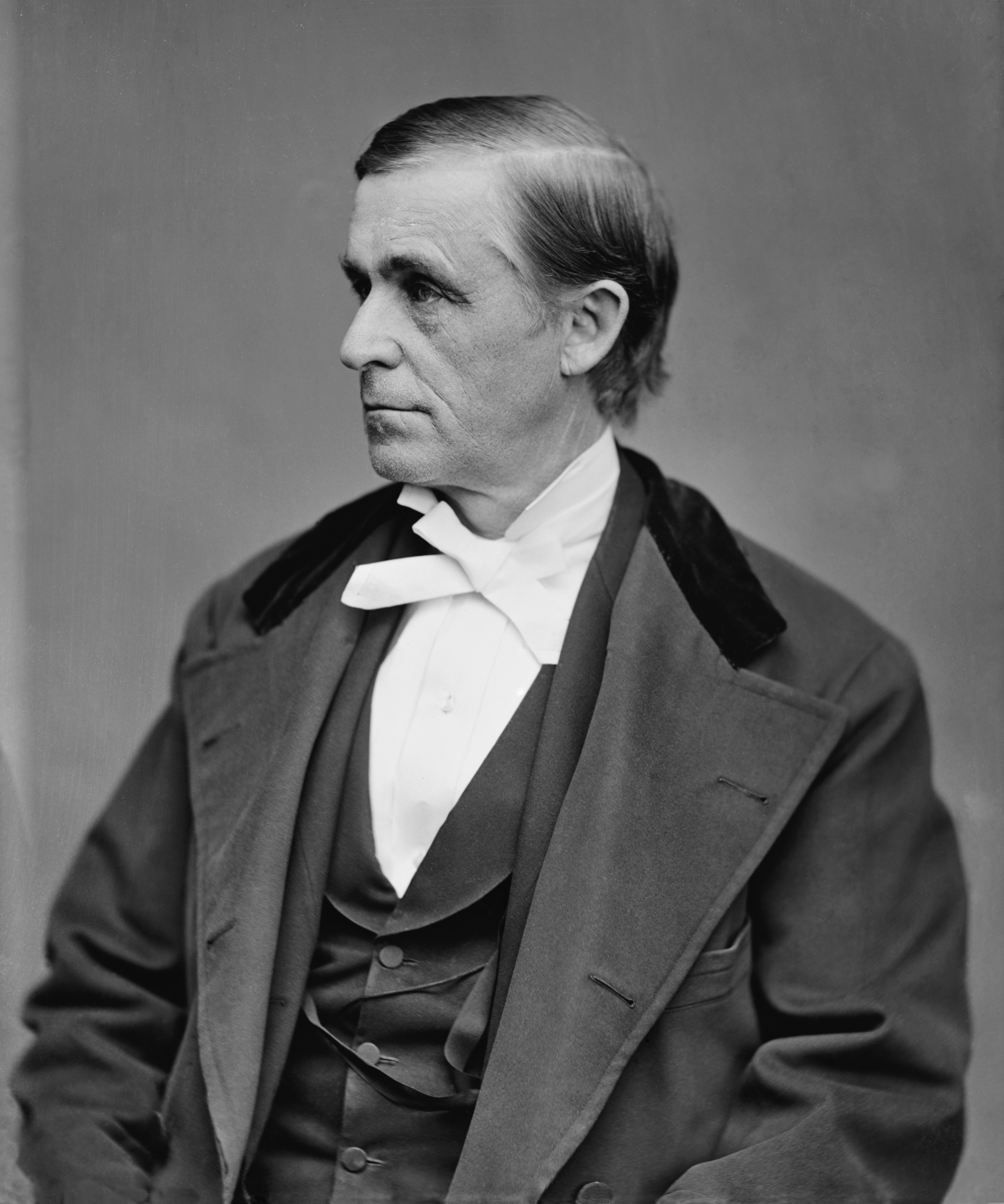
- Sunderland between 1870 and 1880
- Born: November 22, 1819; Shoreham, Vermont, U.S.
- Died: June 30, 1901 (aged 81); Catskill, New York, U.S.
- Resting place: Catskill, New York, U.S.
- Occupation: Presbyterian minister
- Spouse: Mary Elizabeth Tomlinson (m. 1843; died 1896)
- Children: 3

Byron Sunderland (November 22, 1819 – June 30, 1901) was an American Presbyterian minister, author, and Chaplain of the United States Senate during the American Civil War.

== Biography ==
Sunderland was born on November 22, 1819, to Asa and Olive (Wolcott) Sunderland in the town of Shoreham, Vermont. Both of his grandfathers served in the American Revolutionary War. After spending his childhood in Shoreham, he attended Middlebury College a few miles away and graduated from there in 1838, later receiving a D.D. in 1855 from the same school. He taught for some time before attending the Union Theological Seminary in the City of New York.

In 1843, Sunderland became pastor of the Presbyterian Church at Batavia, New York. By 1851 he had become pastor-elect of the Park Presbyterian Church in Syracuse, New York before being called to the First Presbyterian Church in Washington, D.C. In 1853, Sunderland began a distinguished 45-year tenure as senior pastor at the First Presbyterian Church in Washington. In 1857, he began to preach in favor of the abolition of slavery, a courageous act in a city that was essentially a conservative Southern town. A further courageous act was allowing Frederick Douglass to speak from the pulpit in 1866.

Sunderland was appointed to the office of Chaplain of the Senate in 1861, serving for three years. He resigned in 1864 to accept the post of Pastor of the American Chapel in Paris, France. He served in that position from September 1864 until October 1865, when he returned to Washington to resume his duties as Pastor of the First Presbyterian Church. Following his return to Washington, he also served several terms as chaplain of the US House of Representatives and the US Senate. He served as the president of Howard University from 1867 to 1869, and on the first board of directors of Gallaudet College in Washington. He retired from his pastorate of the First Presbyterian Church in Washington in 1898, becoming pastor emeritus for life.

When Grover Cleveland was elected president, he began attending Sunderland's church.

On June 2, 1886, in the Blue Room of the White House Sunderland performed the marriage service for the wedding of President Cleveland and Frances Cornelia Folsom, the daughter of Cleveland's former law partner. It was the only time that a president has been married in the White House.

Sunderland served on the executive committee of the American Colonization Society.

Sunderland died of a cerebral embolism at the home of his daughter and son-in-law, Rosalie and Orrin Day, in Catskill, New York on June 30, 1901. His wife, Mary Elizabeth Tomlinson Sunderland, predeceased him in 1896. He left his estate to the only one of his three children to survive him, Rosalie Day, with instructions to "transmit some suitable token to all relatives and friends."

== Works ==
- Prelacy Discussed: Or, A Book for Batavians, 1848
- Christian Life and Character of the Civil Institutions of the United States, developed in the official and historical annals of the Republic, Introduction written by Byron Sunderland, 1864
- A Sketch of the Life of Dr. William Gunton, 1878
- A Discourse by Rev. Dr. Byron Sunderland: On the Shooting of President Garfield at the Depot in Washington, Saturday Morning, July 2d, 1881, by Charles J. Guiteau : Delivered at the First Presbyterian Church, Washington, D.C., Sabbath Morning, July 3d, 1881, written with Charles J. Guiteau

== Notes ==
- Howard University School of Medicine, Daniel Smith Lamb, Howard University (1971). Howard University Medical Department, Washington, D.C. Ayer Publishing. ISBN 0-8369-8946-5.
- New York Times story
- Part of will from Washington Post via New York Times

Religious titles
Preceded by Phineas Densmore Gurley	41st US Senate Chaplain; July 10, 1861 – May 11, 1864	Succeeded by Thomas Bowman
Preceded by John Philip Newman	45th US Senate Chaplain; December 8, 1873 – March 24, 1879	Succeeded by Joseph J. Bullock
Academic offices
Preceded by Charles B. Boynton	President of Howard University; 1867–1869	Succeeded by Oliver O. Howard
