= Senator Clouse =

Senator Clouse may refer to:

- Bill Clouse (born 1952), Kentucky State Senate
- Stan Clouse (born 1956), Nebraska State Senate
