= Robbie Fletcher =

Kentucky educator

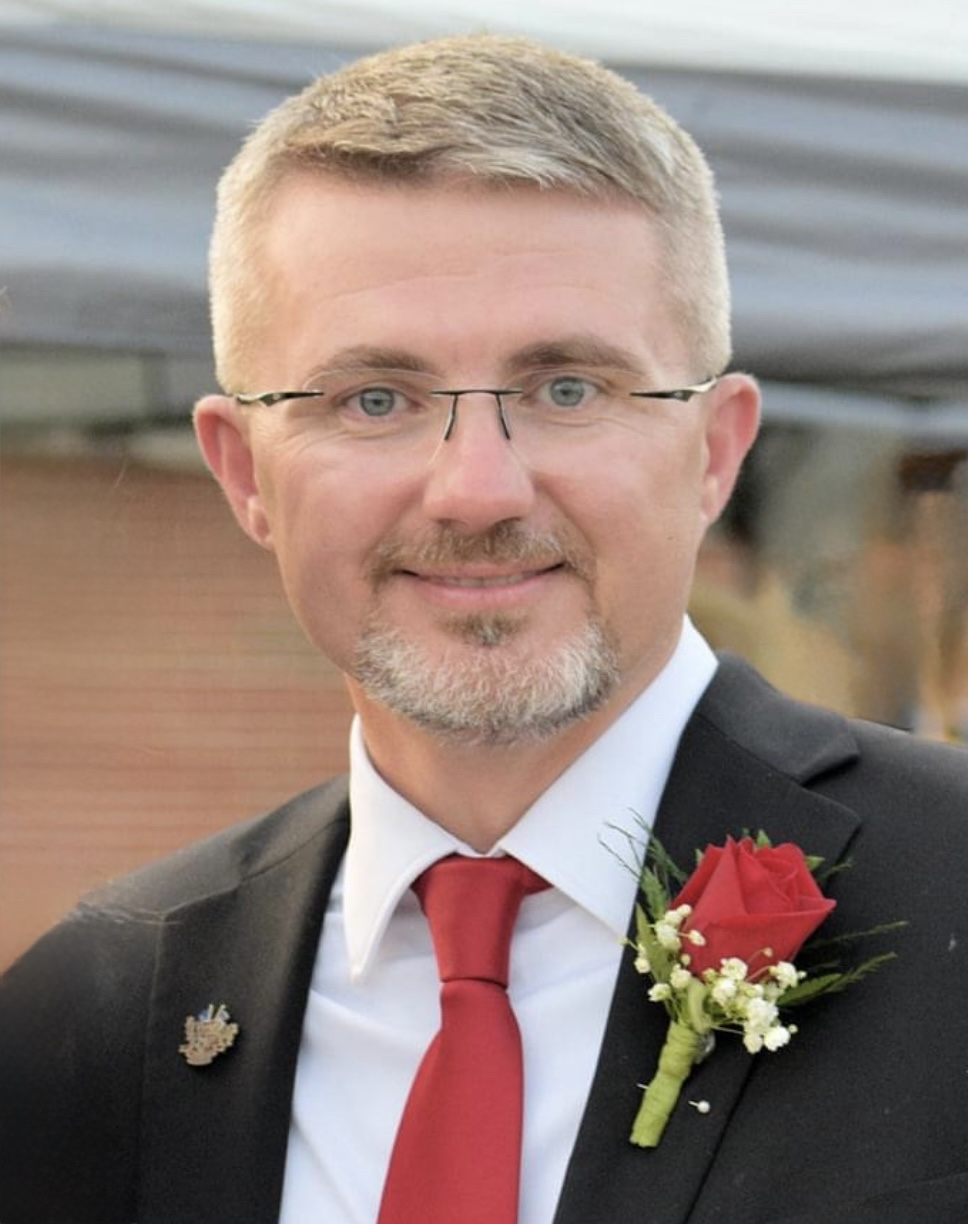
- Fletcher in 2021

9th Kentucky Commissioner of Education
- Incumbent
- Assumed office July 1, 2024
- Preceded by: Jason Glass

Personal details
- Spouse: Melissa Fletcher
- Children: 3
- Education: Morehead State University (BA, Ed.D); University of Kentucky (MA)

Robbie Fletcher is an American educator who has served as the Kentucky Commissioner of Education since 2024. He previously served as superintendent of Lawrence County Schools from 2014 to 2024.

== Education and career ==
Fletcher graduated from Sheldon Clark High School in 1992. He graduated from Morehead State University with a bachelor's degree in mathematics in 1996. He started his career in education as a math and science teacher soon after his graduation from Morehead State at the now-defunct Inez Middle School in Inez, Kentucky. Fletcher graduated from the University of Kentucky with a master's degree in 2002. In the 2004–2005 school year, Fletcher became the assistant principal of Inez Middle School. In 2005–2006, Fletcher became the principal at Warfield Middle School. In 2009–2010, he became the principal of his alma mater, Sheldon Clark High School. He received his doctorate in education from Morehead State University in 2013.

Ahead of the 2014–15 school year, Fletcher was appointed to be the superintendent of Lawrence County Schools, a role he would serve in until 2024.

== Kentucky Commissioner of Education ==
On March 21, 2024, Fletcher was named by the Kentucky Department of Education to be the next state Commissioner of Education. Fletcher was confirmed by the Kentucky Senate to fill the position on April 15, 2024, and began his tenure on July 1. Fletcher is the first commissioner to be confirmed by the senate following the passage of Senate Bill 107 during the 2023 Kentucky General Assembly.
