= Bridport, Vermont =

- Town
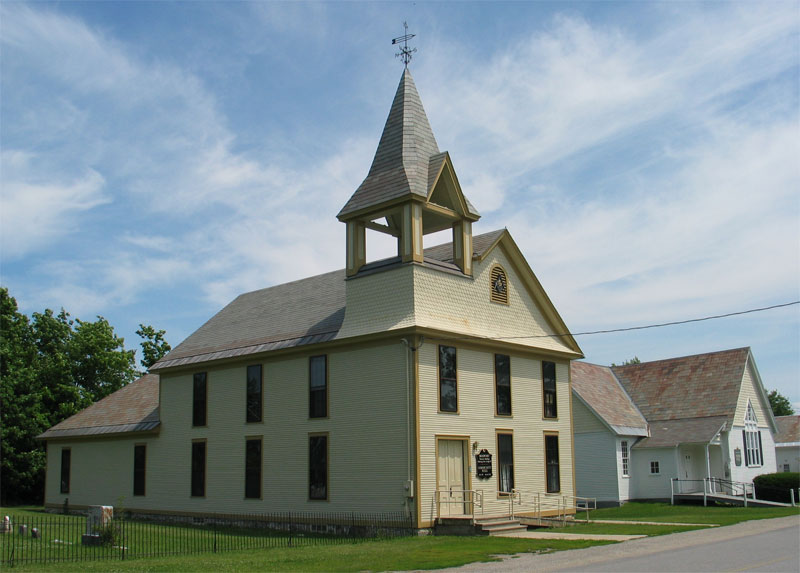
- Bridport community hall

- Seal
- Motto: There's only one Bridport, USA
- Location in Addison County and the state of Vermont
- Coordinates: 43°59′35″N 73°21′05″W
- Country: United States
- State: Vermont
- County: Addison
- Chartered: 1761
- Settled: 1768
- Organized: 1784
- Communities: Bridport; West Bridport

Area
  - Total: 46.3 sq mi (119.8 km^{2})
  - Land: 44.0 sq mi (113.9 km^{2})
  - Water: 2.3 sq mi (5.9 km^{2})
- Elevation: 151 ft (46 m)

Population (2020)
  - Total: 1,225
  - Density: 28/sq mi (10.8/km^{2})
- Time zone: UTC-5 (Eastern (EST))
  - Summer (DST): UTC-4 (EDT)
- ZIP code: 05734
- Area code: 802
- FIPS code: 50-08575
- GNIS feature ID: 1462051
- Website: bridportvt.org

Bridport is a town in Addison County, Vermont, United States. The town was founded October 9, 1761. The population was 1,225 at the 2020 census. The town is named after Bridport, a town in the west of the county of Dorset, in the United Kingdom.

== Demographics ==
Historical population
Census	Pop.	Note	%±
1790	449		—
1800	1,124		150.3%
1810	1,520		35.2%
1820	1,511		−0.6%
1830	1,774		17.4%
1840	1,480		−16.6%
1850	1,393		−5.9%
1860	1,298		−6.8%
1870	1,171		−9.8%
1880	1,167		−0.3%
1890	1,018		−12.8%
1900	956		−6.1%
1910	848		−11.3%
1920	745		−12.1%
1930	703		−5.6%
1940	665		−5.4%
1950	663		−0.3%
1960	653		−1.5%
1970	809		23.9%
1980	997		23.2%
1990	1,137		14.0%
2000	1,235		8.6%
2010	1,218		−1.4%
2020	1,225		0.6%
U.S. Decennial Census

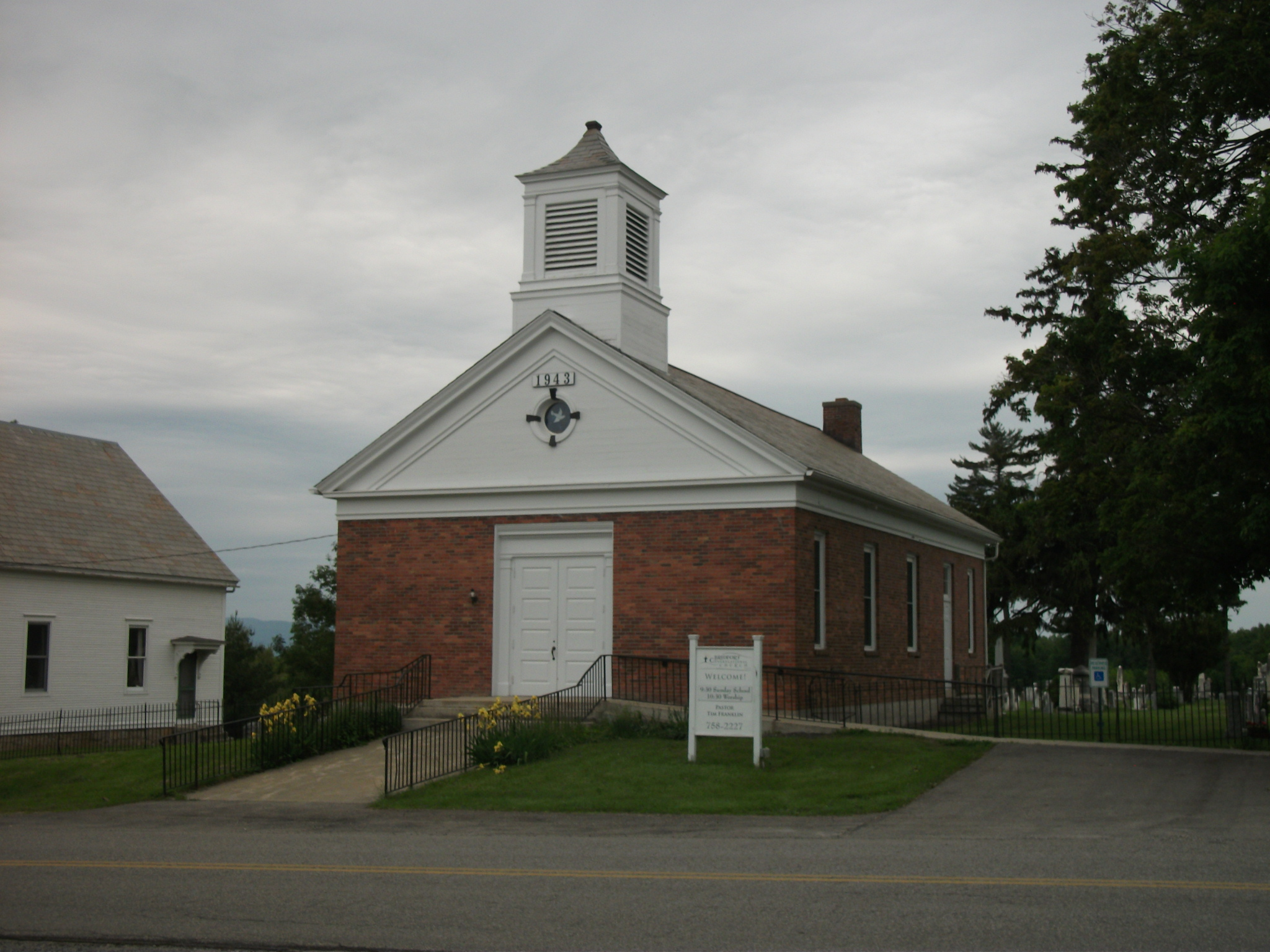
The Bridport Congregational Church in town

As of the census of 2000, there were 1,235 people, 456 households, and 343 families residing in the town. The population density was 28.1 people per square mile (10.8/km^{2}). There were 553 housing units at an average density of 12.6 per square mile (4.9/km^{2}). The racial makeup of the town was 98.30% White, 0.24% Native American, 0.40% Asian, and 1.05% from two or more races. Hispanic or Latino of any race were 0.08% of the population.

There were 456 households, out of which 33.6% had children under the age of 18 living with them, 63.8% were married couples living together, 6.1% had a female householder with no husband present, and 24.6% were non-families. 18.6% of all households were made up of individuals, and 8.1% had someone living alone who was 65 years of age or older. The average household size was 2.71 and the average family size was 3.07.

In the town, the age distribution of the population shows 26.9% under the age of 18, 8.2% from 18 to 24, 27.0% from 25 to 44, 25.3% from 45 to 64, and 12.7% who were 65 years of age or older. The median age was 36 years. For every 100 females, there were 107.2 males. For every 100 females age 18 and over, there were 102.9 males.

The median income for a household in the town was $44,531, and the median income for a family was $48,542. Males had a median income of $28,839 versus $23,950 for females. The per capita income for the town was $19,720. About 3.4% of families and 6.9% of the population were below the poverty line, including 12.0% of those under age 18 and 5.1% of those age 65 or over.

=== 2020 census ===
Bridport racial composition
Race	Num.	Perc.
White (non-Hispanic)	1,127	92.00%
Black or African American (non-Hispanic)	10	0.82%
Native American	1	0.08%
Asian	2	0.16%
Pacific Islander	0	0
Other/Mixed	34	2.78%
Hispanic or Latino	51	4.16%

== Education ==
Children in preschool through fifth grade attend Bridport Central School at the village center of Bridport, grades 6, 7 and 8 attend Middlebury Union Middle School and grades 9–12 attend Middlebury Union High School in Middlebury.

== Geography ==
According to the United States Census Bureau, the town has a total area of 46.2 square miles (119.8 km^{2}), of which 44.0 square miles (113.9 km^{2}) is land and 2.3 square miles (5.9 km^{2}) (4.89%) is water.

== Notable people ==
- Charles A. Eldredge, US Congressman from Wisconsin
- Harold W. Giard, Member of the Vermont House of Representatives and Vermont Senate
- Edgar Harkness Gray, Chaplain of the United States Senate
- Rawson C. Myrick, Secretary of State of Vermont
- Julius A. Willcox, Associate Justice of the Vermont Supreme Court
