= Howard E. Armstrong =

American politician (1903–1983)

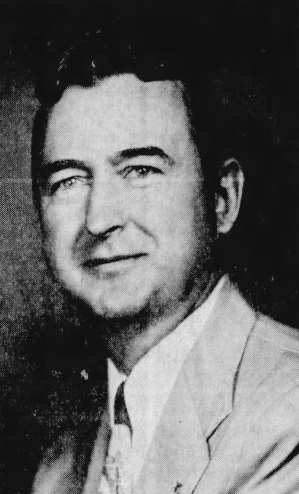
- The Montpelier Monitor (Montpelier, Vermont), October 19, 1961

30th Secretary of State of Vermont
- In office 1949–1965
- Governor: Ernest W. Gibson Jr. Harold J. Arthur; Lee E. Emerson; Joseph B. Johnson; Robert Stafford; F. Ray Keyser Jr. Philip H. Hoff
- Preceded by: Helen Burbank
- Succeeded by: Harry H. Cooley

Vermont Commissioner of Industrial Relations
- In office 1939–1949
- Preceded by: None (position created)
- Succeeded by: John T. Conley

Vermont Commissioner of Industries
- In office 1936–1939
- Preceded by: Charles R. White
- Succeeded by: None (position eliminated)

Vermont Secretary of Civil and Military Affairs
- In office 1935–1936
- Preceded by: Lua B. Edson
- Succeeded by: Eleanor Dana

Clerk of the Vermont House of Representatives
- In office 1927–1935
- Preceded by: Charles R. White
- Succeeded by: Leon E. Ellsworth

Personal details
- Born: April 19, 1903 Bennington, Vermont, US
- Died: October 7, 1983 (aged 80) Montpelier, Vermont, US
- Resting place: Plymouth Notch Cemetery, Plymouth Notch, Vermont, US
- Party: Republican
- Spouse: Margaret Ellen Brown (m. 1929)
- Children: 1
- Education: University of Vermont (attended)
- Profession: Attorney

Howard Edwin Armstrong (April 19, 1903 – October 7, 1983) was a public official in Vermont who served as Secretary of State for sixteen years.

== Biography ==
Armstrong was born in Bennington, Vermont on April 19, 1903, the son of Marcus P. Armstrong (1864–1928) and Alice J. Cordes (1868–1953). He graduated from Bennington High School in 1922, and attended the University of Vermont from 1922 to 1923. He decided on a legal career, and studied law with Harry Chase of Bennington, and in the Ludlow office of William W. Stickney and John G. Sargent. Armstrong was admitted to the bar in 1926.

A Republican, Armstrong served as second assistant clerk of the Vermont House of Representatives in 1925, and was the House Clerk from 1927 to 1935. He was Secretary of Civil and Military Affairs (chief assistant) to Governor Charles Manley Smith from 1935 to 1936. Armstrong was Vermont's deputy Commissioner of Industries in 1936. He served as commissioner from 1936 to 1939, and Commissioner of Industrial Relations from 1939 to 1949.

In 1948, Armstrong was the successful Republican nominee for Secretary of State. He was reelected seven times, and served from January 1949 to January 1965. Armstrong was defeated by Harry H. Cooley during the Democratic landslide of 1964, which was the first time a Democrat had ever won the Secretary of State's office.

In 1968, Republican Richard C. Thomas won the Secretary of State's position. He employed former Secretaries Armstrong and Helen Burbank on a consulting basis at the start of his eight-year tenure.

== Retirement ==
In retirement, Armstrong resided in Montpelier. He died at his home on October 7, 1983; he was being treated for cancer, and his death was caused by a self-inflicted gunshot wound. He was buried at Plymouth Notch Cemetery in Plymouth Notch, Vermont.

== Family ==
In 1929, Armstrong married Margaret Ellen Brown (1907–1996). They were the parents of a son, Cordes V. Armstrong, (1935–2000).

== Sources ==
=== Newspapers ===
- Maerki, Vic (November 4, 1964). "Hoff, Johnson Sweep Elections". Burlington Free Press. Burlington, VT. p. 1 – via Newspapers.com.
- "Two Former Secretaries of State May Aid Thomas". Burlington Free Press. Burlington, VT. Free Press Capitol Bureau. November 14, 1968. p. 15 – via Newspapers.com.
- "Obituary, Howard E. Armstrong". Burlington Free Press. Burlington, VT. October 9, 1983. p. 18 – via Newspapers.com.

=== Books ===
- Myrick, Rawson C. (1929). State of Vermont Legislative Directory. Montpelier, VT: Vermont Secretary of State. p. 506.

=== Internet ===
- "Biography, Howard E. Armstrong" (PDF). Description, Secretary of State Howard E. Armstrong Collection. Montpelier, VT: Vermont Secretary of State. Vermont State Archives. p. 1. Archived from the original (PDF) on March 4, 2016.
- "Howard Edwin Armstrong Birth, Vermont Vital Records, 1720-1908". Ancestry.com. Provo, UT: Ancestry.com, LLC. April 19, 1903.
- "Howard Edwin Armstrong and Margaret Ellen Brown Entry, Vermont Marriage Records, 1909-2008". Ancestry.com. Provo, UT: Ancestry.com, LLC. July 20, 1929.
- "Howard E. Armstrong Entry, Vermont Death Records, 1909-2008". Ancestry.com. Provo, UT: Ancestry.com, LLC. October 7, 1983.

Party political offices
Preceded by Rawson C. Myrick	Republican nominee for Secretary of State of Vermont; 1948, 1950, 1952, 1954, 1956, 1958, 1960, 1962, 1964	Succeeded by Byron C. Hathorn
Political offices
Preceded by Helen Burbank	Secretary of State of Vermont; 1949–1965	Succeeded by Harry H. Cooley
