= Edgar Gray =

Edgar Gray may refer to:

- Edgar Harkness Gray (1813–1894), American clergyman
- Dunc Gray (1906–1996), Edgar "Dunc" Gray, Australian track cyclist
