= Harry A. Black =

American politician (1879–1923)

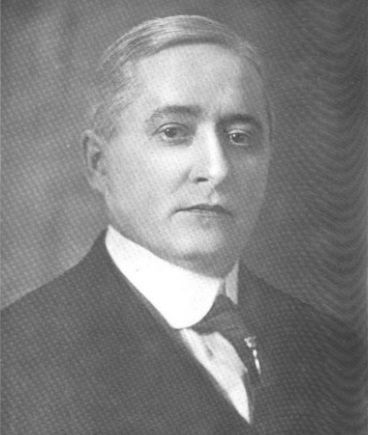
From volume 26 (1921) of "The Vermonter" magazine.

Harry A. Black (November 22, 1879 – April 9, 1923) was a Vermont attorney and public official. He served as Secretary of State of Vermont from 1919 until his death.

== Biography ==
Harry Alonzo Black was born in Coventry, Vermont on November 22, 1879, the son of Melvina Brooks and farmer Henry F. Black. He was educated in the public schools of Orleans County, and graduated from Derby Academy in 1899. Black then studied law in St. Johnsbury and Newport. He was admitted to the bar in 1903, and practiced in Newport.

A Republican, he served as second assistant clerk of the Vermont House of Representatives in 1906, and first assistant clerk in 1908 and 1910. During the legislative sessions from 1912 to 1918, Black was the Clerk of the House. From 1918 to 1920 he also served as a member of Newport's city council.

In 1918, Black was elected Secretary of State. He was reelected in 1920 and 1922, and served from January 1918 until his death.

== Death ==
Black died in Wells River on April 9, 1923 as the result of injuries he sustained when he was struck by a train as he was en route from Newport to Montpelier. According to news accounts, Black had been ill at his home for a month before beginning his trip, and appeared to faint as he was changing trains. Witnesses indicated that he stepped out of the Wells River station and walked across several tracks to board the train for Montpelier. He fell onto one track, and a moving train hit him before onlookers could take action to rescue him. Orlando L. Martin, the Speaker of the Vermont House of Representatives, was with Black at the time of the accident, but was not injured. Black was buried at East Main Street Cemetery in Newport.

== Family ==
In 1905, Black married Jennie Gates of Newport. Their children included: Henry, Raymond, Gordon, Gerald, and Kenneth.

== Sources ==
=== Books ===
- Proceedings of the Vermont Historical Society. Montpelier, VT: Vermont Historical Society. 1923. p. 270.

=== Newspapers ===
- "Secretary of State H. A. Black Killed at Wells River". Burlington Free Press. Burlington, VT. April 10, 1923. pp. 1–2.

Party political offices
Preceded by Guy W. Bailey	Republican nominee for Secretary of State of Vermont; 1918, 1920, 1922	Succeeded by Aaron H. Grout
Political offices
Preceded by Frederick G. Fleetwood	Vermont Secretary of State; 1919–1923	Succeeded by Aaron H. Grout
