= Jeremiah Milton Nance =

American cattle drover and rancher (1850–1926)

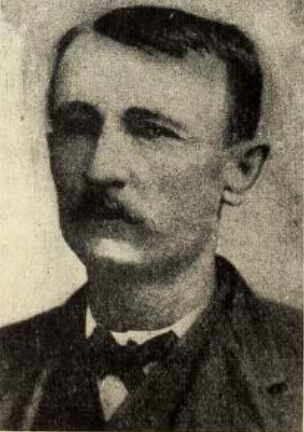
- Nance in a 1925 publication
- Born: April 6, 1850; Hempstead County, Arkansas, US
- Died: September 16, 1926 (aged 76)
- Occupations: Cattle drover, rancher
- Relatives: Ezekial Edward Nance (father); J. Milton Nance (grandson)

Jeremiah Milton Nance (April 6, 1850 – September 16, 1926) was an American cattle drover and rancher.

== Early life and education ==
Nance was born on April 6, 1850, in Hempstead County, Arkansas, the son of Ezekial Edward Nance and Luany Weightsell (née Pate) Nance. Before the age of two, his mother died, and c. 1854, he and his father moved to near Mountain City, Texas. There, he attended the local school, until 1860, afterwards attending a one-room school built by his father from logs. He then attended the Johnson Institute, a boarding school.

== Career ==
On August 22, 1872, Nance registered a livestock brand in the shape of a pitchfork. He later partnered with his father, and on December 16, 1874, they registered a brand in the shape of a spade.

On April 15, 1877, Nance and ten cowboys drove 2,300 north through Fort Worth and Dodge City, Kansas, ending at Cheyenne, Wyoming in mid-July of the same year. In 1880, he drove a herd north via the Great Western Cattle Trail, though ended the journey at Dodge City, as the cattle refused to drink from the salty Brazos River. He sold a separate herd – 2,000 head large – to a ranch in Ogallala, Nebraska, though did not participate in the droving.

In 1883, Nance entered a partnership with a Presidio County ranch. He then spent ten years with the Toyah Land and Cattle Company grazing cattle at the foothills of the Davis Mountains. In 1885, he drove 3,000 head of cattle from Columbus, Texas, to Presidio County. He drove 2,000 head of cattle to Coolidge, Kansas, after using rail to first transport them to Big Spring. Due to drought and overgrazing, he and fellow ranchers moved their cattle westward in fall 1888. In spring 1889, a cyclone passed through the ranch they had moved to, killing 152 head of cattle and injuring hundreds of others.

== Personal life and death ==
Nance retired to a farm near Kyle. He owned 530 acres of land, having purchased 480 on February 18, 1878, followed by another 50, on January 10, 1884. By 1894, 250 acres of his land was used for agriculture, and he also had a manmade lake.

Days after returning to Texas from his first droving trip, Nance proposed to Sebastiance Matilda Haupt. They married on October 24, 1877, having eleven children together, though two died during childhood. He died on September 16, 1926, aged 76, and was buried at Kyle Cemetery. His grandson was historian J. Milton Nance.
