= Spencer Cobb =

American politician (1916–1962)

- Cobb in 1961

Member of the Kentucky Senate from the 22nd district
- In office January 1, 1962
- Preceded by: Paul E. Jackson
- Succeeded by: Hazel Warner Cobb

Personal details
- Born: July 7, 1916 Jessamine County, Kentucky, US
- Died: January 1, 1962 (aged 45) Lexington, Kentucky, US
- Resting place: John W. Cobb Cemetery; Jessamine County, Kentucky
- Party: Democratic
- Spouse: Hazel Warner Cobb

Spencer Lamar Cobb (July 7, 1916 – January 1, 1962) was an American politician and member of the Kentucky Senate from Kentucky's 22nd Senate district, which at the time comprised Jessamine, Madison, Mercer, and Woodford counties.

He is noted for having the shortest tenure of any member of the Kentucky General Assembly, serving for only three and a half hours before his death on New Year's Day in 1962.

== Early life and education ==
Spencer Lamar Cobb was born in Jessamine County, Kentucky, to Meritt and Virginia (Burdine) Cobb. His father was a well known farmer in Lebanon. Spencer attended Nicholasville High School, where he was active in athletics and played fullback for the school's football team. On May 9, 1935, Cobb married Hazel Warner.

=== Father's murder ===
On July 13, 1936, Lindsey Warner, Spencer's father-in-law, shot and killed Spencer's father. Spencer, his mother, and his wife witnessed the shooting and testified at the subsequent hearings later that year. According to their testimony, Meritt and Lindsey had been driving and began to argue with each other upon their return to the Cobb farm. Meritt was alleged to have been drunk and threatened Lindsey's life before proceeding to throw rocks at him. After this, Lindsey stated that he pulled his pistol in self-defense and shot once, piercing Meritt's heart and killing him nearly instantly. On November 10, Lindsey was found guilty of murder and sentenced to five years in the state penitentiary.

== Political career ==
Cobb ran unsuccessfully in the 1949 Democratic primary for judge/executive of Jessamine County, losing to his former classmate and football teammate Russell Brumfield by just over 100 votes. During the administration of Governor Lawrence Wetherby, Cobb served as assistant director of motor transportation under commissioner John M. Kinnaird. In 1953, Cobb was speculated as a candidate again for judge/executive of Jessamine County, but ultimately did not run. In 1955, he resigned from his position to serve as director of safety and personal for the Hughes Transportation Company.

In 1961, a longstanding rotation agreement between the county Democratic parties composing the 22nd Senate district determined that it was Jessamine County's turn to select their district's state senator. Cobb announced his candidacy in November 1960, and was opposed by J. Samuel "Sammy" Sternberg. Sternberg was a personal friend and factional ally of former governor Happy Chandler, while Cobb aligned himself with Governor Bert Combs. Cobb won the 1961 Democratic primary with 8,047 votes (54.6%), winning all counties in the district except Mercer, and was unopposed in the 1961 Kentucky Senate election that November.

== Death ==
On December 23, 1961, Cobb suffered his third heart attack in four months while attending a college basketball game between Kansas State and Kentucky in Lexington. He was subsequently admitted to Central Baptist Hospital, where he remained for eight days. He suffered another heart attack on the morning of January 1, 1962, after which Governor Combs traveled to Lexington in order to administer Cobb the oath of office at 10 a.m. in his hospital bed. While talking with a nurse, Cobb died at 1:30 p.m. With approximately three and a half hours between the time he was sworn into office and the time of his death, Cobb's tenure is the shortest on record for any member of the Kentucky General Assembly. (Note: The 2005 LRC research report on General Assembly membership cites Cobb as having the shortest tenure of any member on record. However, it incorrectly states that his tenure was two hours instead of three and a half as is evidenced by contemporary sources.)

Funeral services were conducted on January 4, and he was buried at the Cobb family cemetery in Jessamine County. Among his pallbearers was congressman John C. Watts. The state senate adopted a memorial resolution the day prior, and appointed a delegation of five senators to attend the funeral.

Combs called for a special election to be held on January 27. On January 8, the four county Democratic party chairman of the 22nd Senate district gathered in Watts' office, and unanimously selected Hazel Cobb to be their nominee to fill her late husband's seat. She won the special election with no Republican opposition, and was sworn into office on January 29 by Combs. She served as member of the Kentucky Senate until the end of her term in January 1966.
