= John George Butler =

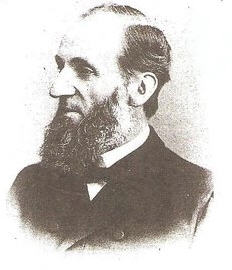
- The Rev. John George Butler

Chaplain of the United States House of Representatives
- Incumbent
- Assumed office 1860s

Chaplain of the United States Senate
- In office 1886–1893

Personal life
- Born: January 28, 1826 Cumberland, Maryland, U.S.
- Died: August 2, 1909 (aged 83) Washington, D.C., U.S.
- Spouse: Ann E. Butler
- Children: Ella C. Butler, Dr. William K. Butler, Rev. Charles H. Butler, Grace E. Butler
- Education: Gettysburg College, Gettysburg Seminary
- Occupation: Lutheran clergyman

Religious life
- Religion: Lutheran
- Denomination: Lutheranism
- Church: Luther Place Memorial Church
- Ordination: 1848

John George Butler (January 28, 1826 – August 2, 1909) was a prominent Lutheran clergyman who served as Chaplain of the Senate and as Chaplain of the United States House of Representatives.

== Early years ==
John George Butler was born in Cumberland, Maryland on January 28, 1826, the son of Jonathan Butler. His paternal grandfather and namesake was a well-known pioneer minister of the Evangelical Lutheran church. He was educated at the Cumberland Academy and graduated from the Pennsylvania College (now Gettysburg College), and the Gettysburg Lutheran Seminary at Gettysburg, Pennsylvania. He worked for a time at his father's store in Berlin, Pennsylvania.

== Ministry ==
Ordained in 1848, he became pastor of the St. Paul's Lutheran Church in Washington, D.C. in 1849, serving there twenty-four years. He was one of the first regimental and hospital chaplains appointed by President Abraham Lincoln at the outbreak of the American Civil War. He also served as chaplain to George Atzerodt, one of Lincoln's assassins, assuring him of divine compassion even to the gallows. At the end of the war he returned to Washington and was elected Chaplain of the United States House of Representatives.

He was the organizing pastor of the Luther Place Memorial Church, in Washington, D.C., founded in 1873. He was also responsible for the heroic statue of Martin Luther in Luther Place, erected in 1884 on Luther's 400th anniversary.

Butler served as Chaplain of the Senate (1886–1893), and as professor of church history and homiletics at Howard University. He died at the age of 83, on August 2, 1909, in his home, in Washington, D.C.

== Personal life ==
John George and Ann E. Butler were the parents of Ella C. Butler, Dr. William K. Butler, Charles H. Butler (who was also a Lutheran pastor), and Grace E. Butler.

Religious titles
Preceded by Charles B. Boynton	46th US House Chaplain; March 4, 1869 – December 6, 1875	Succeeded by S.L. Townsend
Preceded by Elias DeWitt Huntley	48th US Senate Chaplain; March 15, 1886 – April 6, 1893	Succeeded by William Henry Milburn
