= Ezekiel Edward Nance =

American politician and rancher (1816–1885)

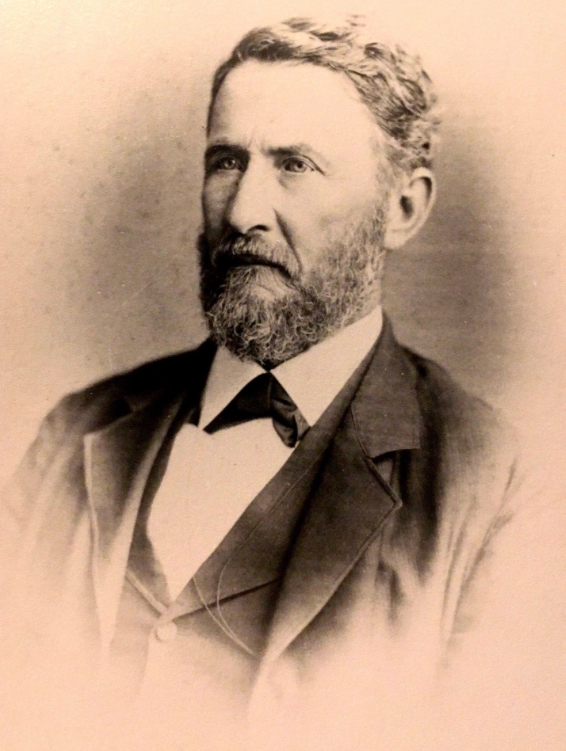

Treasurer of Arkansas
- In office 1849–1854
- Preceded by: William Adams
- Succeeded by: Archibald Hamilton Rutherford

Personal details
- Born: September 12, 1816 Tennessee, US
- Died: September 15, 1885 (aged 69)
- Relations: J. Milton Nance (great-grandson)
- Children: 12, including Jeremiah
- Occupation: Politician, rancher

Ezekiel Edward Nance (September 12, 1816 – September 15, 1885) was an American politician and rancher. He served as Treasurer of Arkansas, and as a rancher, was one of the most successful cattlemen in Hays County, Texas in his time.

== Biography ==
=== Early life ===
Nance was born on September 12, 1816, in Tennessee, one of two sons born to Lewis Nance and Lucy (née Kepler) Nance. In the 1820s, the family moved onto a farm near Fulton, Arkansas. His parents died later into his childhood, and he lived with other family. He then moved to Washington. He married Luany Weightsell Pate on October 22, 1840, having six children together, including rancher Jeremiah Milton Nance. Luany died on February 22, 1852.

=== 1847–1853: Arkansas and early Texas ===
In 1847, Nance was sheriff of Hempstead County. Originally serving to complete the unexpired term of his predecessor who had resigned, he won the following election and served a full term. In the 1850 United States census, he was listed as owning 24 slaves. From 1849 to 1854, he served as Treasurer of Arkansas.

Later in the same year of his wife's death, Nance moved to Texas. He settled near Kyle, by a stream of the Blanco River which he named Little Arkansas Creek. On June 15, 1852, he purchased 10,000 acres of recently surveyed land, later purchasing 4,000 more acres. He returned to Arkansas for some time, marrying Martha Jane Alexander on April 7, 1853; they had six children together. He returned to the Texas in fall, bringing along with him his wife, children, siblings, and slaves, as well as soldier George Green and his wife.

=== 1853–1881: ranching and later career ===
In November 1853, Nance registered a horse brand in Hays County, the second brand ever registered in the county. He had his property fenced with stones, after which he turned it into a cattle ranch. His ranch was one of the first successful ranches in the area. As his ranch grew, he developed additional housing, as well as a dam and several milling facilities; these developments became the community "Nance's Mill". In the 1850s, he had a blacksmith ship, schoolhouses, and a church built, then in 1865 had the church replaced with the Blanco Chapel, which stands as a historic site. He also convinced pastor Hubbard Hinde Kavanaugh to travel to Texas, in 1860. The community declined in the 1880s, after rail bypassed it.

In April 1858, Nance, Edward Burleson Jr., and William Smith were selected to lead a road from San Marcos to Nance's Mill; after the areas were connected, the road was extended to Dripping Springs. During the American Civil War, he manufactured cotton and raised beef for the Confederate States Army. His slaves further fenced his land in late 1863. Following the war's end, he was pardoned by President Andrew Johnson. The cattle industry was weal during the Reconstruction era, but Nance recovered. He had a meat packing plant built in 1867. In 1869, his property was flooded, which he recovered from. During the 1870s, the demand for cattle grew in the north, and Nance had his cattle moved to the northern markets; these droves were primarily overseen by his son Jeremiah. On December 16, 1874, he and his son registered a cattle brand in the shape of a spade.

The 1870 United States census estimated Nance's net worth at $20,000, and in 1883, was the second-largest landowner in Hays County. He expanded his milling facilities, and in 1876, had one of the largest mills in the area constructed. In 1880, the International–Great Northern Railroad passed through Hays County, and as a result Nance moved his mills to Kyle. He had a cotton gin facility built in 1881. He was an early investor into the Kyle Baptist Seminary in the early 1880s.

Nance died on September 15, 1885, aged 69, and was buried at Kyle Cemetery. His great-grandson was historian J. Milton Nance.
