= Kentucky Superintendent of Public Instruction =

Defunct political office

- Seal of the Commonwealth of Kentucky
- Type: State constitutional officer
- Status: Defunct
- Term length: Four years, non-consecutive
- Formation: February 16, 1838
- First holder: Joseph J. Bullock
- Final holder: John Stephenson
- Abolished: November 3, 1992

The Kentucky Superintendent of Public Instruction was a statewide constitutional officer of the commonwealth of Kentucky that served as the commonwealth's chief school official until the position's responsibilities were transferred to the Kentucky Commissioner of Education in 1990. The position was abolished by voters in 1992.

== History ==
=== Establishment ===
On February 16, 1838, Governor James Clark approved an act of the Kentucky General Assembly to establish the commonwealth's first common school system. This act included the creation of the state superintendent of public instruction, state board of education, and empowered each county to form their own board of education. Being preceded by only Massachusetts and Michigan, Kentucky was the third state in the United States to pass such measures. Per statute, the superintendent would be appointed to a two-year term by the governor and approved by the Kentucky Senate. The superintendent was chiefly responsible for clerical duties, and was paid a salary of $1,000 per year.

Governor Clark appointed Presbyterian clergyman Joseph J. Bullock as Kentucky's first superintendent of public instruction in 1838. The appointment of Bullock was the first in a trend for the early superintendents to be chosen from the ranks of religious leadership such as Hubbard Hinde Kavanaugh and Benjamin Bosworth Smith. However, Bullock would only serve in this position for a year and a half before resigning and calling for a larger salary that was commensurate with the commitment needed for future superintendents to continue their focus on the responsibilities of their office rather than another form of supplementary employment.

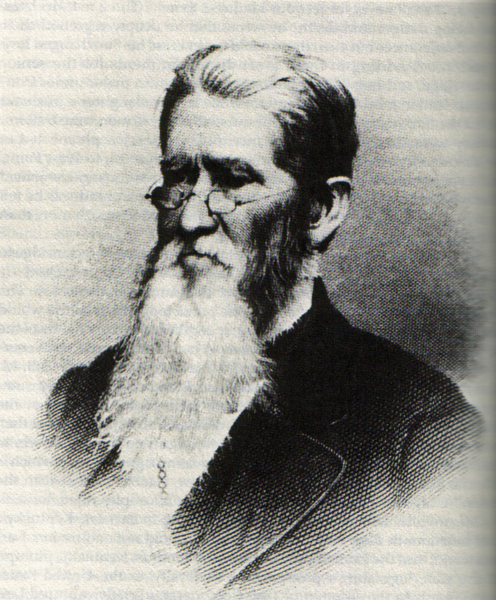
Superintendent Robert Jefferson Breckenridge (1847–1853) has been cited as the "Father of Kentucky's public schools."

Following the ratification of the 1850 Kentucky constitution, the superintendent was made a statewide constitutional officer who would be elected to serve a term of four years. The first elected superintendent was incumbent Robert Jefferson Breckenridge, who had been appointed to the position in 1847 by Governor William Owsley. Alongside this distinction, Breckenridge is also credited as the most effective and impactful of the early superintendents and has been cited as the father of Kentucky's public schools.

When the 1891 Kentucky constitution was ratified, the superintendent and other constitutional officers were limited to serve non-consecutive four year terms.

=== Kentucky Education Reform Act ===
In 1990, the Kentucky Education Reform Act (KERA) was signed by Governor Wallace Wilkinson. Included were provisions for the reduction of the superintendent's salary from $67,000 to $3,000 annually and the delegation of nearly all of the position's authority to the newly created office of the Kentucky commissioner of education. Due to an oversight, some of the superintendent's ex-officio board positions remained such as their place on the state fire board and child abuse prevention council.

The last elected superintendent, John Stephenson, pushed back against these reforms. After assuming office in 1991, he made a speech in which he threatened to file a lawsuit against the state and proclaimed himself to be the chief school officer of the commonwealth. Lawmakers responded by filing a number of measures to strip the superintendent of his remaining board seats and to abolish the position itself. By early 1992, Stephenson backed down and instead requested that his salary be restored to $67,000 as well as be provided an office, staff, and supplies. None of these requests were met, and soon after lawmakers designated the superintendent as only the chief civilian advocate for education.

== Abolition ==
Between 1921 and 1992, there were six constitutional amendments on the ballot to either abolish the superintendent's office or remove it as an elected position. However, until 1992 all of these attempts were defeated by the voters. During the November general election of that year both Amendment #2 and Amendment #3 contained provisions to abolish the office. Despite Amendment #3 being defeated, Amendment #2 passed with 540,156 votes (51.1%) and successfully abolished both the office of the superintendent of public instruction and register of the land office. According to Kentucky Attorney General Chris Gorman, the amendment was self-executing and immediately eliminated the offices upon their passage, a fact that was contested by John Stephenson.

In 1993, Stephenson appealed to have the superintendent reinstated as a constitutional officer. This effort did not succeed, and on April 19, 1993, Kentucky's superintendent of public instruction was removed from the commonwealth's payroll.

== List of superintendents ==
| No. | Image | Name | Party | Term of office |
|---|---|---|---|---|
| 1. | | Joseph J. Bullock | N/A | 1838–1839 |
| 2. | | Hubbard Hinde Kavanaugh | N/A | 1839–1840 |
| 3. | | Benjamin Bosworth Smith | N/A | 1840–1842 |
| 4. | | G. W. Brush | N/A | 1842–1843 |
| 5. | | Ryland T. Dillard | N/A | 1843-1847 |
| 6. | | Robert Jefferson Breckenridge | Whig | 1847–1853 |
| 7. | | John Daniel Matthews | Democratic | 1853–1859 |
| 8. | | Robert Carter Richardson | Democratic | 1859–1863 |
| 9. | | Daniel Stevenson | Union Democratic | 1864–1868 |
| 10. | | Zachariah Frederick Smith | Democratic | 1867–1871 |
| 11. | | Howard A. M. Henderson | Democratic | 1871–1879 |
| 12. | | Joseph Desha Pickett | Democratic | 1879–1887 |
| 13. | | Ed Portor Thompson | Democratic | 1887–1895 |
| 14. | | William Jefferson Davidson | Republican | 1895–1899 |
| 15. | | Harry Vernon McChesney | Democratic | 1899–1903 |
| 16. | | James H. Fuqua | Democratic | 1903–1907 |
| 17. | | John Grant Crabbe | Republican | 1907–1910 |
| 18. | | Ellsworth Regenstein | Republican | 1910–1912 |
| 19. | | Barksdale Hamlett | Democratic | 1912–1916 |
| 20. | | Virgil O. Gilbert | Democratic | 1916–1920 |
| 21. | | George W. Colvin | Republican | 1920–1924 |
| 22. | | McHenry Rhoades | Democratic | 1924–1928 |
| 23. | | W. C. Bell | Democratic | 1928–1932 |
| 24. | | James H. Richmond | Democratic | 1932–1936 |
| 25. | | Harry W. Peters | Democratic | 1936–1940 |
| 26. | | John W. Brooker | Democratic | 1940–1944 |
| 27. | | John Fred Williams | Republican | 1944–1948 |
| 28. | | Boswell B. Hodgkin | Democratic | 1948–1952 |
| 29. | | Wendell P. Butler | Democratic | 1952–1956 |
| 30. | | Robert R. Martin | Democratic | 1956–1959 |
| interim | | Ted C. Gilbert | Democratic | 1959-1960 |
| 31. | | Wendell P. Butler | Democratic | 1960–1964 |
| 32. | | Harry M. Sparks | Democratic | 1964–1968 |
| 33. | | Wendell P. Butler | Democratic | 1968–1972 |
| 34. | | Lyman V. Ginger | Democratic | 1972–1976 |
| 35. | | James B. Graham | Democratic | 1976–1980 |
| 36. | | Raymond H. Barber | Democratic | 1980–1983 |
| 37. | | Alice McDonald | Democratic | 1983–1987 |
| 38. | | John Brock | Democratic | 1987–1991 |
| 39. | | John A. Stephenson | Democratic | 1991–1992 |
