= John Philip Newman =

American bishop of the Methodist Episcopal Church

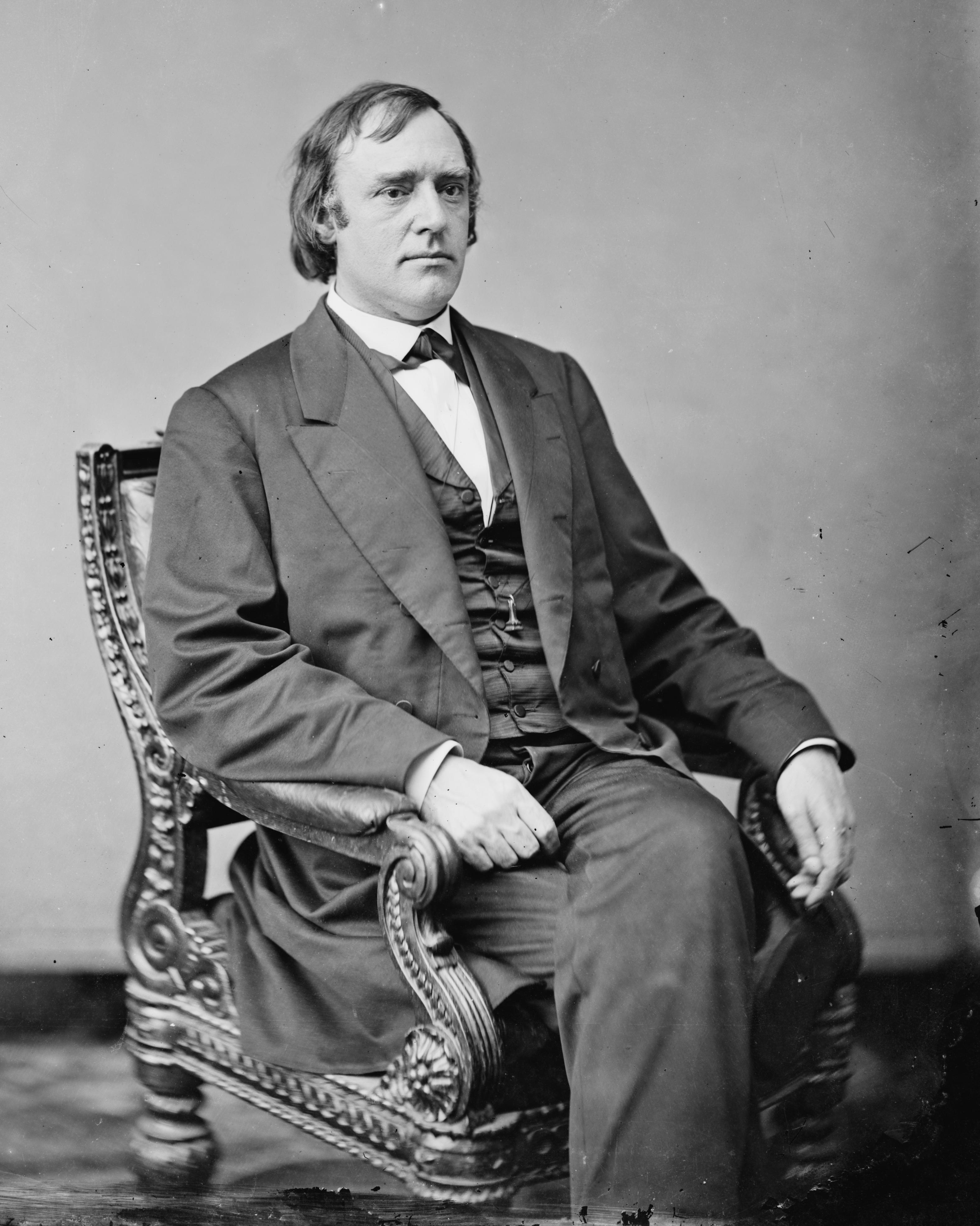
- John P. Newman
- Born: September 1, 1826; New York City
- Died: July 5, 1899 (aged 72); Saratoga Springs, New York
- Burial place: Mechanicville, NY
- Occupation: Bishop

John Philip Newman (1 September 1826 – 5 July 1899) was an American bishop of the Methodist Episcopal Church, elected in 1888.

== Birth and family ==
Newman was born in New York City to John and Mary Newman. His father was of German descent, his mother of French. John was converted to the Christian faith at the age of sixteen and became a member of the M.E. Church. He married Miss Angeline Ensign, the daughter of the Rev. Datus Ensign, who was one of the early Methodist ministers in Northern New York.

== Education ==
John entered the Seminary at Cazenovia, New York, where he pursued college preparatory and theological studies, intending to enter Wesleyan University. But acting on the advice of friends, he did not proceed to college, but instead entered the Methodist ministry.

== Ordained ministry ==
John entered upon pastoral work in 1848 as a member of the Oneida Annual Conference of the M.E. Church. During his first year his salary was only one hundred dollars. At the end of the year, after paying all of his expenses, he had five dollars remaining. Each succeeding year, with a single exception, he saved some part of his salary, however small it might be. He also pastored at Hamilton, New York.

In 1855 he was transferred to the Troy Annual Conference. In 1857-58 Rev. Newman was stationed in Albany, New York, where his preaching first attracted attention outside his own denomination. In 1858 he was transferred to the New York Annual Conference and stationed in New York City.

== Travels and missions ==
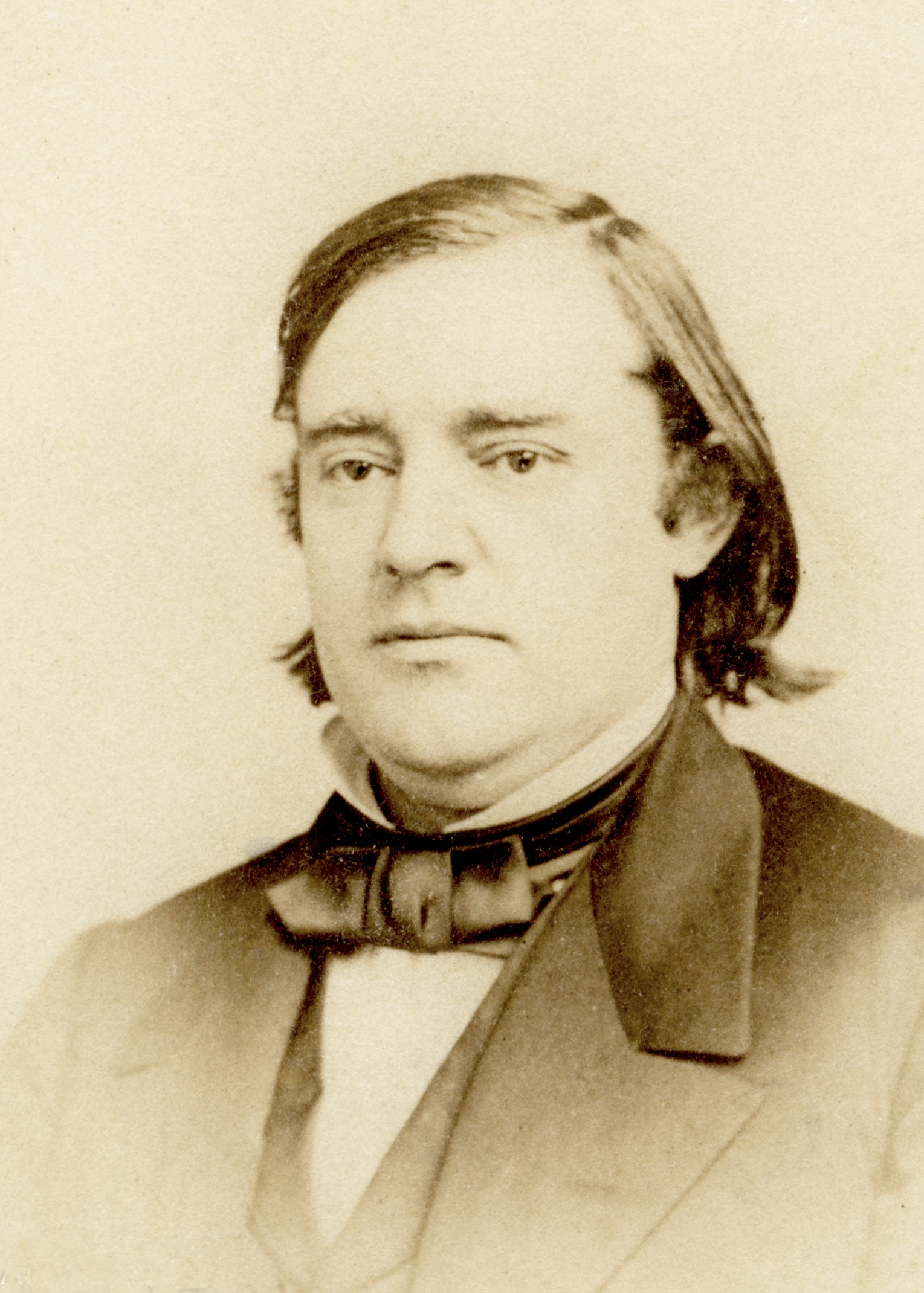
John Philip Newman, c. 1863

In the spring of 1860 he sailed for Europe. After an extensive tour on the Continent he visited the East, and for a year made a thorough study of Bible lands: Egypt, Arabia, and Palestine. As a result of his research he wrote a book on the Holy Land, entitled "From Dan to Beersheba."

Upon his return from his travels, Rev. Newman was again stationed in New York City, remaining for two years. In 1864 he was sent by Bishop Ames to establish the M.E. Church in Louisiana, Texas, and Mississippi. The M.E. Church (the northern branch) had ceased to exist in these states after the great ecclesiastical secession of 1844; the Methodists in that region instead organized as the Methodist Episcopal Church, South. Rev. Newman began his mission in New Orleans, where he soon built a church worth fifty thousand dollars. He founded a seminary and an orphan asylum, as well, each with ample buildings and endowments. Indeed, out of the mission Rev. Newman then organized grew four Annual Conferences of the M.E. Church.

In 1870, Newman traveled to Salt Lake City via the newly completed Transcontinental Railroad for a highly publicized debate with Latter-day Saint church leaders over the controversial subject of polygamy. For three days Newman and LDS Apostle Orson Pratt debated the question, "Does the Bible sanction polygamy?" Transcripts of the debate were carried by major newspapers throughout the country. On the third and final day of the debate, more than 11,000 people reportedly crammed into the city's famed tabernacle to hear Newman's and Pratt's remarks.

== Washington, D.C. ==
In 1869 Rev. Newman was appointed to Washington as Pastor of the Metropolitan M.E. Church, which he helped organize. He retired from this pulpit in the Spring of 1872. However, it was a general wish that he should return to it as soon as it was admissible, and he accordingly resumed his pastorate in the Spring of 1875.

In the meantime, Dr. Newman was Chaplain of the United States Senate, twice by unanimous vote, first assuming this position 8 March 1869, serving until 1874.

One biographer wrote this of Rev. Newman:

"In pastoral work Dr. Newman is as useful and successful as in the pulpit. Since his return he has felt the necessity of, and has sought, a more complete consecration to Christ, and a fuller anointing of the Holy Ghost, and on this he relies for the success of his ministry."

== Government service ==
In the Spring of 1873 Dr. Newman was appointed by President Ulysses S. Grant as Inspector of United States Consulates in Asia, serving 1874-76. In discharge of the duties of this position, Dr. Newman crossed the Pacific Ocean, traveling extensively in China, Japan, and other oriental countries with which the U.S.A. had diplomatic relations. He prosecuted his investigations with great industry and conscientious faithfulness. His habits of observation and ability to describe what he saw pre-eminently fitted him for the duties he was required to perform.

Dr. Newman's report to the United States Department of State covered more than two hundred pages, containing observations and suggestions of great value to the Government. His expenses amounted to only two thousand, three hundred dollars, covering his service for one and one-half years.

During various investigations, which were rife in 1876, Dr. Newman was summoned before a Congressional Committee, in answer to whose interrogations he gave much important information relating to the U.S. Diplomatic Service. Indeed, the Committee was surprised at the value of services, which had instead been represented in some of the newspapers as a mere "pleasure tour." Upon his return, Dr. Newman used his extensive notes in the preparation of a work entitled, "Thrones and Palaces of Babylon and Nineveh."

== Pastoral ministry resumed ==
Upon his return from overseas Government work, Rev. Newman returned to the pulpit of the Metropolitan Church, Washington, where he served an additional three years. He was then transferred to the Central Methodist Church in New York City, where he also served three years. In the winter of 1882 he accepted a unanimous invitation to become Pastor of the Madison Avenue Congregational Church in New York, serving two years.

Upon his resignation from the Madison Ave. church, Rev. Newman visited California. He was then called upon to minister to President Ulysses S. Grant in his final illness. Dr. Newman then was appointed a third time to the Metropolitan Church in Washington, serving a final two years.

== Service to the M.E. Church ==
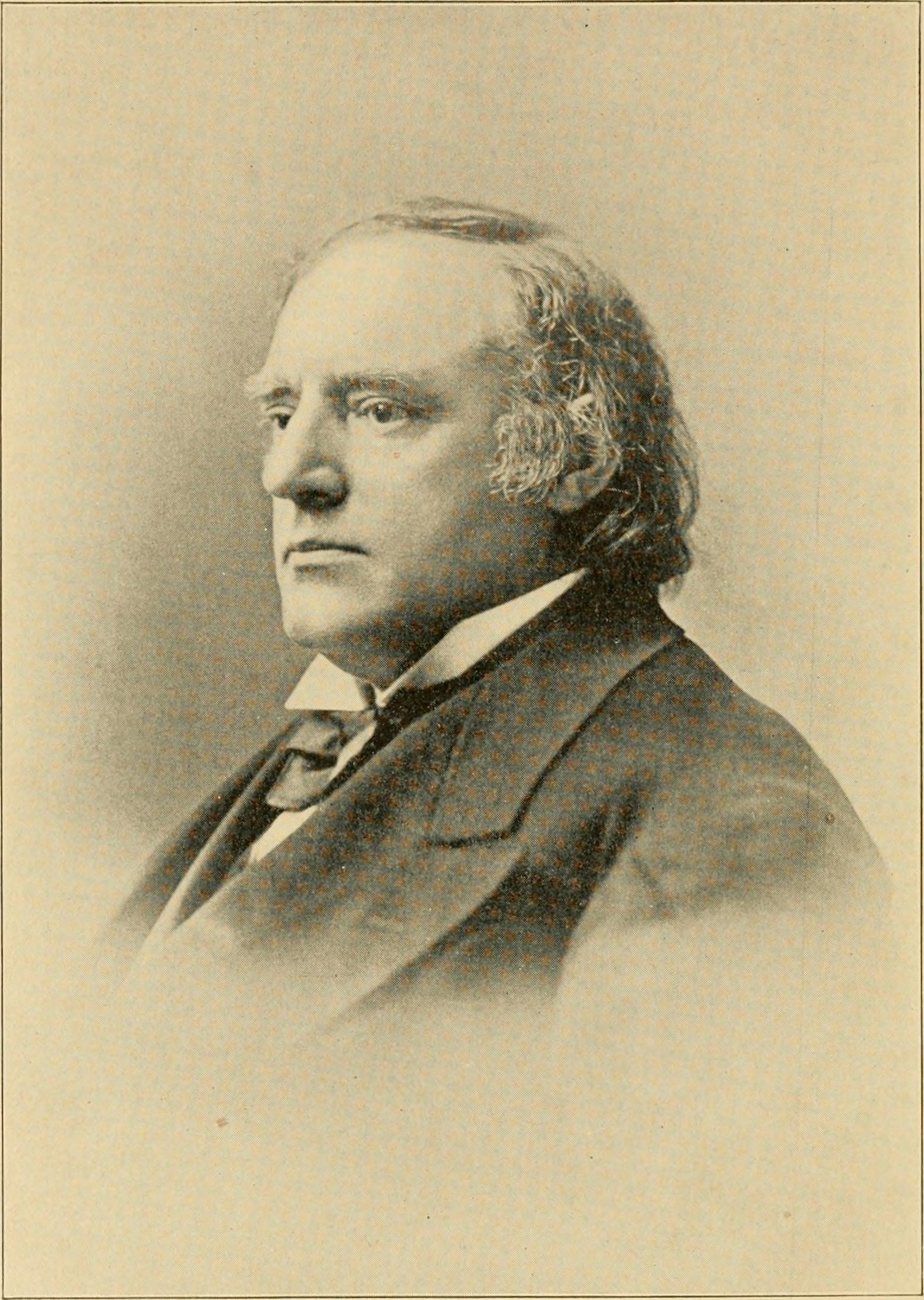
Newman later in life

Dr. Newman was thrice elected a delegate to the General Conference of his denomination. In 1876 he served as a commissioner to help adjust the relations of the M.E. and M.E., South Churches. In 1881 he was sent to England as a delegate to the Methodist ecumenical council.

In 1885 he delivered a discourse at the funeral of President Grant. In 1887 he delivered another discourse at the funeral of General John A. Logan. Indeed, Dr. Newman was known as one of the most eloquent pulpit orators of his Church, and was known throughout the Nation as a popular lecturer.

== Episcopal ministry ==
Bishop Newman was elected to the episcopacy at the 1888 General Conference of the M.E. Church. He was a delegate to the first and second Ecumenical Conferences.

Bishop Newman died 5 July 1899 in Saratoga Springs, New York and is buried in Mechanicville, New York.

== Honorary degrees ==
Rev. Newman was honored in 1863 by the University of Rochester with the D.D. degree. He received the LL.D. degree from Grant Memorial University in 1881. Otterbein College also honored him with the LL.D. in 1881.

== Selected writings ==
- From Dan to Beersheba, New York, 1864.
- Babylon and Nineveh, 1875.
- Christianity Triumphant, 1884.
- Evenings with the Prophets on the Lost Empires, 1887.
- America for Americans, Washington, 1887.

== See also ==
- List of bishops of the United Methodist Church

== Notes ==
Religious titles
Preceded by Edgar Harkness Gray	44th US Senate Chaplain; March 8, 1869 – December 8, 1873	Succeeded by Byron Sunderland
