= Aaron H. Grout =

American politician (1879–1966)

Aaron Hinman Grout
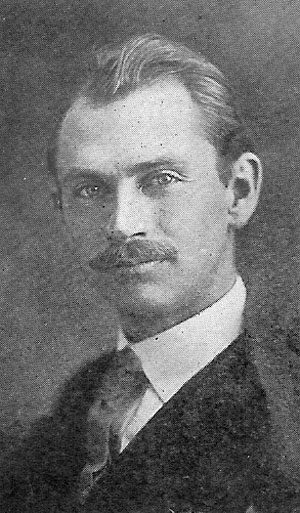
- From 1919's Memoir of General William Wallace Grout and Autobiography of Josiah Grout

Member of the Vermont Senate from Chittenden County
- In office January 5, 1949 – January 3, 1951 Serving with William L. Hammond, Charles P. Smith Jr., Holger C. Petersen
- Preceded by: William L. Hammond, Charles P. Smith Jr., Ernest L. Whitney, John Deschenes
- Succeeded by: Holger C. Petersen, Robert S. Babcock, Edward W. Mudgett, Fortis Abbott

Judge of the Burlington, Vermont Municipal Court
- In office February 1, 1933 – September 30, 1941
- Preceded by: Hamilton S. Peck
- Succeeded by: Myron I. Samuelson

27th Vermont Secretary of State
- In office April 21, 1923 – March 4, 1927
- Governor: Redfield Proctor Jr. Franklin S. Billings; John E. Weeks
- Preceded by: Harry A. Black
- Succeeded by: Rawson C. Myrick

Member of the Vermont House of Representatives from Newport City
- In office January 5, 1921 – April 20, 1923
- Preceded by: Dean N. Dwinell
- Succeeded by: William C. Lindsay

State's Attorney of Orleans County, Vermont
- In office 1912–1916
- Preceded by: Willard M. Wright
- Succeeded by: Colby Stoddard

Personal details
- Born: January 18, 1879 Rock Island, Illinois, US
- Died: December 29, 1966 (aged 87) Burlington, Vermont, US
- Resting place: Lakeview Cemetery, Burlington, Vermont
- Party: Republican
- Spouse: Edith Goddard Hart
- Children: 2
- Education: University of Vermont
- Profession: Attorney

Military service
- Allegiance: United States; Vermont
- Branch/service: Vermont Army National Guard
- Years of service: 1893–1901; 1910-1915
- Rank: Major
- Unit: Staff of Governor George H. Prouty; 1st Vermont Infantry Regiment
- Battles/wars: Spanish–American War

Aaron Hinman Grout (January 18, 1879 – December 29, 1966) was an American judge and political figure who served as Secretary of State of Vermont.

== Early life ==
Grout was born in Rock Island, Illinois, on January 18, 1879. He was the son of Governor Josiah Grout and Harriet Hinman Grout. He was also the nephew of Congressman William W. Grout.

Grout was raised in Derby and Newport, Vermont, and graduated from Derby Academy in 1896.

== Military service ==
In 1893, he joined the National Guard. Enlisting in Company I, 1st Vermont Infantry Regiment as a private, he attained the rank of corporal before receiving his commission as a captain and serving as an aide to brigade commander Brigadier General Julius J. Estey. During the Spanish–American War, he aided Estey in organizing and mustering the National Guard soldiers who made up the unit federalized as the 1st Vermont Volunteer Infantry Regiment. He left the National Guard in 1901.

== Start of career ==
Grout graduated from the University of Vermont in 1901, studied law with Newport attorney John W. Redmond, and attained admission to the bar in 1904. He practiced in Newport, first as an associate of the firm Young and Young, and later in partnership with his father. A Republican, Grout served as a messenger in the Governor's office during his father’s term in office, 1896 to 1898. During the governorship of Fletcher D. Proctor (1906–1908), he was the governor's executive clerk. He served as Secretary of Civil and Military Affairs (chief assistant) to Governor George H. Prouty (1908 to 1910).

Grout was chairman of the Orleans County Republican Convention in 1908, a delegate to the Republican state convention in 1908 and 1910, and president of the Newport Republican Club in 1908 and 1910. From 1912 to 1916, Grout served as Orleans County State’s Attorney, a position previously held by his uncles Theophilus and William Grout.

== Continued military service ==
During his service on Governor Prouty's staff, Grout also served as Prouty's military secretary with the rank of major, and he continued his military service after 1910 as the Judge Advocate of the Vermont National Guard.

During World War I, he was a lieutenant colonel in the Vermont Volunteer Militia, the home guard organization formed to handle the National Guard's domestic missions while its soldiers were deployed overseas.

== Later career ==
Grout served in the Vermont House of Representatives from 1921 to 1923. In 1923, the Secretary of State, Harry A. Black, died in office. Grout was appointed to fill the vacancy. He was elected to a full two-year term in 1924, and was re-elected in 1926. He served as Secretary of State from the time of his appointment in April 1923 until resigning in May 1927.

Grout resigned as Secretary of State to relocate to Burlington and become Treasurer and Manager of the Vermont Acceptance Corporation, a company that made loans to finance the purchase of homes, automobiles and other items.

From 1933 to 1941, Grout was Judge of Burlington's Municipal Court. In 1948, he was elected to a term in the Vermont Senate.

== Civic memberships ==
Grout was a member of the Congregational church. He was a member of the Grange and the Memphremagog Yacht Club, president of the Burlington Rotary Club and a member of Kappa Sigma fraternity.

Grout was an active member of the Masons. He served as Grand Master of the Grand Lodge of Vermont. He was a 33° Scottish Rite mason and served on the Supreme Council, Scottish Rite, Northern Jurisdiction.

== Death and burial ==
Grout died in Burlington on December 29, 1966. He is buried at Lakeview Cemetery in Burlington.

== Family ==
In 1907, Grout married Edith Goddard Hart of Chelsea, Massachusetts. Their children included daughters Eleanor (1911–1937) and Nancy (1913–1987).

== Other ==
Grout's home at 370 Main Street in Burlington was built in 1881. It is still standing, and has gone through several owners and remodelings. Since 2000, it has been operated as the Lang House Bed & Breakfast.

Party political offices
Preceded by Harry A. Black	Republican nominee for Secretary of State of Vermont; 1924, 1926	Succeeded by Rawson C. Myrick
Political offices
Preceded by Harry A. Black	Vermont Secretary of State; 1923–1927	Succeeded by Rawson C. Myrick
