= Elias DeWitt Huntley =

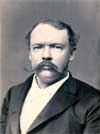
Elias DeWitt Huntley

Elias Dewitt Huntley (19 April 1840 – 12 February 1909) was a Methodist clergyman who served as Chaplain of the Senate.

== Early life ==
Elias Dewitt Huntley, was born April 19, 1840, in Elmira, New York, the son of Frances Tooker and Elias Sanford Huntley. He graduated from Genesee College (1866).

== Ministry ==
He was ordained the same year he graduated and began his ministry by preaching in the Nunda circuit in New York State. Then, he became a professor of ancient languages at Genesee Wesleyan Seminary. After that he went to Wisconsin and served as presiding elder of the Madison district before becoming president of Lawrence University in Appleton, Wisconsin (1879–1883).

He became pastor of the Metropolitan church in Washington, D.C., and while in that city, was elected Chaplain of the Senate (1883–1886).

In 1886, he served the Madison Avenue Methodist church in New York City, and then the First Methodist Church in Annapolis, Maryland (1887–1891), First Methodist Church Baltimore, Maryland (1891–1893), Summerfield Church in Milwaukee, Wisconsin (1893–1895), and Trinity Church, Washington DC (1897–1900).

Huntley died on February 12, 1909, in Washington, D.C.

== Personal life ==
Huntley married Amelia H. Elmore of Milwaukee; their sons George and Sherman did not survive childhood.

Religious titles
Preceded by Joseph J. Bullock	47th US Senate Chaplain; December 18, 1883 – March 15, 1886	Succeeded by John George Butler
