= J. Milton Nance =

American historian and educator (1913–1997)

- Born: Joseph Milton Nance; September 13, 1913; Kyle, Texas, U.S.
- Died: January 17, 1997 (aged 83); Bryan, Texas, U.S.
- Relatives: Jeremiah Milton Nance (grandfather); Ezekial Edward Nance (great-grandfather)

Joseph Milton Nance (September 18, 1913 – January 17, 1997) (Note: Most sources state January 17, though the Library of Congress Linked Data Service states his death date as January 15.) was an American historian and educator with a focus on the history of Texas. From 1941 until his 1979 retirement, he taught at Texas A&M University, and he was the department chair of the Department of History and Government from 1958 to 1968, and of the successor Department of History until 1973. The J. Milton Nance Lectures in Texas History lecture series at TAMU is named in his honor. During the 1966–1967 year, he served on a program committee of the Texas State Historical Association. For much of his life, he lived in College Station, Texas.

== Background ==
Nance was born in Kyle, Texas September 18, 1913. Joseph was the oldest of the eight children of Jeremiah Milton Nance Jr. (Note: July 19, 1884 Kyle, Texas – May 17, 1966 Hays County, Texas) and Mary Louise Hutchinson, (Note: April 4, 1890 Texas – May 29, 1967) who married in 1912. He was the grandson and great-grandson of ranchers Jeremiah Milton Nance and Ezekial Edward Nance, respectively.

Joseph Milton Nance married Eleanor Glenn Hanover in 1944. They had three sons, Jeremiah Milton Nance III (born 1948), (Note: According to Texas state birth records, Jeremiah Milton Nance III was born on February 28, 1948, in Brazos, Texas, U.S.) Joseph Hanover Nance (born 1952), (Note: According to Texas state birth records, Joseph Hanover Nance was born on June 18, 1852, in Brazos, Texas, U.S.) and James Clifton Nance (born 1957). (Note: According to Texas state birth records, James Clifton Nance was born on September 2, 1957, in Brazos, Texas, U.S.)

== Education ==
Nance had received a B.A. in 1935, an M.A. in 1936, and a Ph.D. in 1941, all from University of Texas at Austin. He also received a certificate in naval communications from Harvard in 1943.

== Works ==
Nance's personal papers are archived by the Briscoe Center for American History and are available online.

Nance wrote or edited multiple books, including:

- Nance, J. M. After San Jacinto: The Texas-Mexican Frontier, 1836-1841.
- Nance, J. M. Attack and Counterattack: The Texas-Mexican Frontier, 1842.
- McCutchan, J. D. Nance, J. M. (ed.). Mier Expedition Diary: A Texan Prisoner's Account. Introduction by J. A. Kenamore.
- Baugh, V. E. Rendezvous at the Alamo: Highlights in the Lives of Bowie, Crockett, and Travis. Foreword by J. M. Nance.
- Nance, J. M. McDonald, A. P. (ed.). Dare-Devils All: The Texan Mier Expedition, 1842-1844.
  - Nance, J. M. McDonald, A. P. (ed.). Dare-Devils All: Biographical Data on Selected Members of the Mier Expedition. Vol. 2.
- Puryear, P. A.; Winfield, N. Jr. Sandbars and Sternwheelers: Steam Navigation on the Brazos. Introduction by J. M. Nance.
