= Hubbard Hinde Kavanaugh =

American Methodist minister (1802–1884)

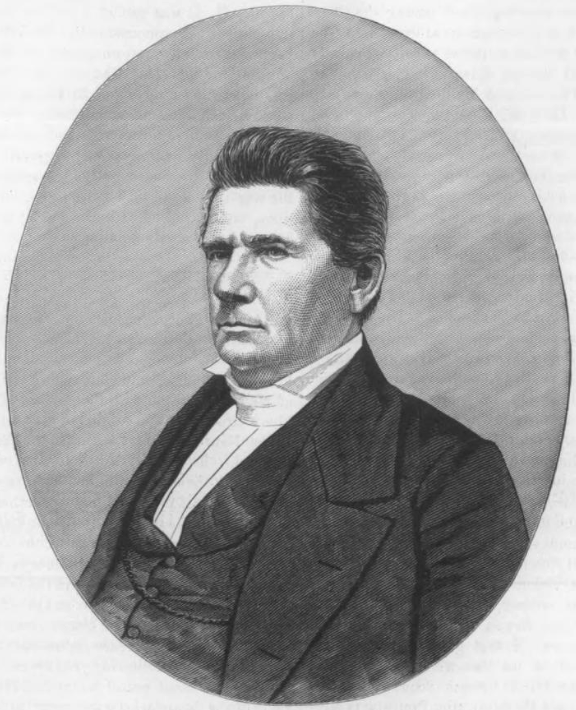
- 1878 portrait of Kavanaugh

Bishop of the United Methodist Church
- In office 1854

Kentucky Superintendent of Public Instruction
- In office 1839–1840
- Preceded by: Joseph J. Bullock
- Succeeded by: Benjamin B. Smith

Personal life
- Born: January 14, 1802 near Winchester, Kentucky, US
- Died: March 19, 1884 (aged 82) Columbus, Mississippi, US
- Relations: Thomas S. Hinde (grandfather)

Religious life
- Religion: Methodist
- Denomination: United Methodist Church

Hubbard Hinde Kavanaugh (January 14, 1802 – March 19, 1884) was an American minister who was a bishop of the United Methodist Church.

== Early life ==
Kavanaugh was born on January 14, 1802, near Winchester, Kentucky, the third son born to William Kavanaugh and Hannah (née Hubbard) Kavanaugh. Through his mother, he was a grandson of minister Thomas S. Hinde. He was named for Hinde, as well as a great-grandfather named Hubbard. He was of Irish and English descent.

Kavanaugh's father died when he was five years old, after which he was raised by his mother. At age thirteen, he entered a printing apprenticeship with Rev. John Lyle. On November 3, 1817, Kavanaugh converted to Christianity. He identified with no particular denomination, though was influenced mainly by Protestants; his father was an Anglician pastor, his mother was Methodist, Lyle was Presbyterian, and the pastor whose sermon converted Kavanaugh was Baptist. Lyle attempted unsuccessfully to convert him to Presbyterianism, and he became a Methodist. He began attending sermons, particularly those of pastor Benjamin Lakin.

== Ministry ==
In early September 1822, Kavanaugh was named a candidate to receive a license to ministry by his local circuit. He was given his license in 1823, with it being signed by pastor Marcus Lindsey. He then moved to Augusta, Kentucky, where he worked for the Western Watchman, a Christian newspaper. As a pastor, he originally preached to rural churches and was regarded as unskilled by those in the towns. However, John P. Finley, a fellow pastor and also President of Augusta College, invited him to speak to a congregation in town; he performed well and gained recognition as a result.

From 1823 to 1827, Kavanaugh and Luke P. Allen were the appointed pastors of the Little Sandy Circuit; Kavanaugh was the junior preacher. It was during this time where he gained notoriety as a minister. By 1827, he was ordained a deacon and elder of the Circuit. From fall 1827 to 1831, he was appointed to the Lexington Circuit, alongside William Adams and Richard Corwine. In 1829, he was appointed to the Louisville Circuit, alongside Littleton Fowler.

Outside of ministry, Kavanaugh was appointed superintendent of public instruction of Kentucky in 1839, a position tasked with overseeing all public schools in the commonwealth. He served for one year, leaving office in 1840.

Kavanaugh was made a bishop in 1854, a position he retained for nearly 50 years. In 1860, he visited Texas, by request of rancher Ezekiel Edward Nance.

== Personal life and death ==
Kavanaugh married Margaret C. Green at some point between 1827 and 1831; Green's father, Charles Railey, was the first cousin of President Thomas Jefferson.

Kavanaugh died on March 19, 1884, aged 82, in Columbus, Mississippi, from a bladder infection.

== Footnotes ==
- Redford, Albert Henry (1884). Life and Times of H. H. Kavanaugh, D. D.: One of the Bishops of the Methodist Episcopal Church, South.
