= Kentucky's 22nd Senate district =

American legislative district

Kentucky's 22nd State Senate district
Senator
Donald Douglas; R–Nicholasville
since November 18, 2021
- Registration: 47.8% Republican; 39.5% Democratic; 12.0% No party preference
- Demographics: 79.3% White; 8.3% Black; 6.1% Hispanic; 2.2% Asian; 0.1% Native American; 0.4% Other; 3.7% Multiracial
- Population (2023): 124,393
- Registered voters (2025): 99,419

Kentucky's 22nd Senatorial district is one of 38 districts in the Kentucky Senate. Located in the central part of the state, it comprises the counties of Garrard, Jessamine, and part of Fayette. It has been represented by Donald Douglas (R–Nicholasville) since 2021. As of 2023, the district had a population of 124,393.

From 1930 to 1931, the district was represented by Happy Chandler, who would later be elected governor and U.S. senator from Kentucky.

== Voter registration ==
On January 1, 2025, the district had 99,419 registered voters, who were registered with the following parties.

Party	Registration	
Party	Voters	%
Republican	47,551	47.83
Democratic	39,251	39.48
Independent	5,938	5.97
Libertarian	502	0.50
Green	103	0.10
Constitution	41	0.04
Socialist Workers	18	0.02
Reform	7	0.01
"Other"	6,008	6.04
Total	99,419	100.00
Source: Kentucky State Board of Elections

== Election results from statewide races ==
=== 2022 – present ===
Year	Office	Results (Note: Figures presented in this table are calculated by summing precinct election results published by the Kentucky State Board of Elections, using precinct data that list each precinct's senatorial district.)
2022	Senator	Paul 57.4 - 42.6%
2022	Amendment 1	No 57.2 - 42.8%
2022	Amendment 2	No 56.5 - 43.5%
2023	Governor	Beshear 55.3 - 44.7%
2023	Secretary of State	Adams 60.4 - 39.6%
2023	Attorney General	Coleman 55.9 - 44.1%
2023	Auditor of Public Accounts	Ball 60.6 - 39.4%
2023	State Treasurer	Metcalf 56.4 - 46.3%
2023	Commissioner of Agriculture	Shell 58.0 - 42.0%
2024	President	Trump 58.7 - 39.2%
2024	Amendment 1	Yes 61.6 - 38.4%
2024	Amendment 2	No 64.5 - 35.5%

== List of members representing the district ==
Member	Party	Years	Electoral history	District location
Spencer Cobb (Nicholasville)	Democratic	January 1, 1962 – January 1, 1962	Elected in 1961. Died.	1944–1964; Jessamine, Madison, Mercer, and Woodford Counties.
Hazel Warner Cobb (Nicholasville)	Democratic	January 29, 1962 – January 1, 1966	Elected to finish Cobb's term. Retired.	1944–1964; Jessamine, Madison, Mercer, and Woodford Counties.
Hazel Warner Cobb (Nicholasville)	Democratic	January 29, 1962 – January 1, 1966	Elected to finish Cobb's term. Retired.	1964–1972
Edward Murphy (Richmond)	Democratic	January 1, 1966 – January 1, 1970	Elected in 1965. Retired.	1964–1972
Edwin Freeman (Harrodsburg)	Democratic	January 1, 1970 – January 1, 1974	Elected in 1969. Retired.	1964–1972
Edwin Freeman (Harrodsburg)	Democratic	January 1, 1970 – January 1, 1974	Elected in 1969. Retired.	1972–1974
John F. Lackey (Richmond)	Democratic	January 1, 1974 – January 1, 1978	Elected in 1973. Retired.	1974–1984
Robert R. Martin (Richmond)	Democratic	January 1, 1978 – January 1, 1987	Elected in 1977. Reelected in 1981. Retired.	1974–1984
Robert R. Martin (Richmond)	Democratic	January 1, 1978 – January 1, 1987	Elected in 1977. Reelected in 1981. Retired.	1984–1993; Jessamine, Madison, and Mercer Counties.
Bill Clouse (Richmond)	Democratic	January 1, 1987 – January 1, 1991	Elected in 1986. Lost reelection.	1984–1993; Jessamine, Madison, and Mercer Counties.
Tom Buford (Nicholasville)	Republican	January 1, 1991 – July 6, 2021	Elected in 1990. Reelected in 1994. Reelected in 1998. Reelected in 2002. Reelected in 2006. Reelected in 2010. Reelected in 2014. Reelected in 2018. Died.	1984–1993; Jessamine, Madison, and Mercer Counties.
Tom Buford (Nicholasville)	Republican	January 1, 1991 – July 6, 2021	Elected in 1990. Reelected in 1994. Reelected in 1998. Reelected in 2002. Reelected in 2006. Reelected in 2010. Reelected in 2014. Reelected in 2018. Died.	1993–1997
Tom Buford (Nicholasville)	Republican	January 1, 1991 – July 6, 2021	Elected in 1990. Reelected in 1994. Reelected in 1998. Reelected in 2002. Reelected in 2006. Reelected in 2010. Reelected in 2014. Reelected in 2018. Died.	1997–2003
Tom Buford (Nicholasville)	Republican	January 1, 1991 – July 6, 2021	Elected in 1990. Reelected in 1994. Reelected in 1998. Reelected in 2002. Reelected in 2006. Reelected in 2010. Reelected in 2014. Reelected in 2018. Died.	2003–2015
Tom Buford (Nicholasville)	Republican	January 1, 1991 – July 6, 2021	Elected in 1990. Reelected in 1994. Reelected in 1998. Reelected in 2002. Reelected in 2006. Reelected in 2010. Reelected in 2014. Reelected in 2018. Died.	2015–2023
Donald Douglas (Nicholasville)	Republican	November 18, 2021 – present	Elected to finish Buford's term. Reelected in 2022. Reelected in 2026.	2015–2023
Donald Douglas (Nicholasville)	Republican	November 18, 2021 – present	Elected to finish Buford's term. Reelected in 2022. Reelected in 2026.	2023–present
