= Thomas Bowman (Methodist Episcopal bishop) =

American bishop of the Methodist Episcopal Church (1817–1914)

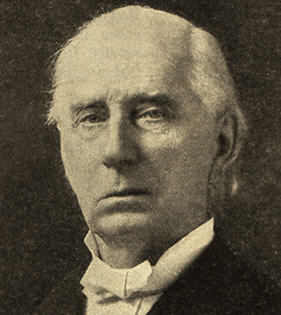
- Bishop Thomas Bowman

President of Indiana Asbury College
- In office 1858–1872

United States Senate Chaplain
- In office May 11, 1864 – March 9, 1865
- President: Abraham Lincoln
- Preceded by: Byron Sunderland
- Succeeded by: Edgar Harkness Gray

President of Dickinson Seminary
- In office 1848–1858
- Preceded by: Inaugural holder

Personal details
- Born: July 15, 1817 Berwick, Pennsylvania, U.S.
- Died: March 4, 1914 (aged 96) East Orange, New Jersey, U.S.
- Resting place: Forest Hill Cemetery; Greencastle, Indiana, U.S.
- Spouse: Matilda Hartman (m. 1841; died 1879)
- Children: 11
- Parent(s): Sarah Brittain Bowman; John Bowman
- Education: Wilbraham Academy; Cazenovia Seminary
- Alma mater: Dickinson College
- Occupation: American bishop, Methodist Episcopal Church

Thomas Bowman (July 15, 1817 – March 3, 1914) was an American bishop of the Methodist Episcopal Church, elected in 1872.

== Early life ==
Bowman was born on July 15, 1817, in Berwick, Pennsylvania, a son of Sarah (née Brittain) Bowman (1786–1852) and John Bowman (1786-1843) and spent his boyhood days on a farm in eastern Pennsylvania. His maternal grandfather, Samuel Brittain, fought in the American Revolutionary War as a private in Captain McCalla's Company from Bucks County, Pennsylvania.

Bowman was educated at Wilbraham Academy in Massachusetts and Cazenovia Seminary before earning his B.A. degree from Dickinson College in 1837 as the head of his class, chosen as valedictorian, and began the study of law at Dickinson Law School but he decided to leave the law and become a minister. Two years later he entered the traveling ministry of the Baltimore Annual Conference of the M.E. Church. He was ordained (deacon and elder) by Bishop Waugh.

== Career ==
Bowman taught in the grammar school of Dickinson College from 1840 to 1843, and five years later founded Dickinson Seminary in Williamsport, Pennsylvania, of which he was president until 1858. Bowman was then chosen as president from 1858 to 1872 and later chancellor from 1884 to 1899 of Indiana Asbury College in Greencastle, Indiana (which in 1884 was renamed DePauw University in honor of Washington C. DePauw).

While he was president of Indiana Asbury College, he also served as the chaplain of the United States Senate from May 1864 until March 1865 during the administration of his friend, Abraham Lincoln. Just five days before Lincoln's assassination, Bowman warned Lincoln that he was in danger of being assassinated by John Wilkes Booth as he saw Booth "prowling about the Capitol buildings and White House, and became convinced that his presence there boded ill for Mr. Lincoln". According to Bowman, Lincoln "laughingly made light of the warning."

During his time at DePauw, Bowman presided over such significant events as the first admissions of women students and of the initial planning (and laying of the cornerstone) of East College. He also served on the university's board of trustees from 1887 to 1895, including a term as president of the board.

Upon his election to the episcopacy, Bowman resigned the Asbury presidency. As a bishop he officially visited all M.E. conferences in the U.S., Europe, India, China, Japan and Mexico.

== Personal life ==
On July 13, 1841, Bowman was married to Matilda Hartman (1821-1879), a daughter of Johannes Hartman and Mary Magdalene (née Crouse) Hartman. Together, they were the parents of eleven children, including:

- John Durban Bowman (1842–1871), who fought in the U.S. Civil War but died unmarried at age 28.
- Theodore Granville Bowman (1845–1923), who married Virginia Florence Lee.
- Thomas Marion Bowman (1846–1914)
- Charles Gideon Bowman (1848–1924), who served as treasurer and manager of the Bowman Stamping Company; he married Florence H. Warren, after her death, he married Mattie Belle Overton.
- William Hamilton Bowman (1850–1939)
- Cecilius Bantz Bowman (1852–1916)
- Mary Crouse Bowman (1853–1937), who married George P. Smith of Baltimore, Maryland.
- Samuel Brittain Bowman (1856–1939), who married Mary Walden in 1884.
- Clarence Mitchell Bowman (1858–1891), who married Elizabeth Amanda Binyon.
- Sarah Elizabeth Bowman (1860–1948), who married Burns D. Caldwell, president of the Wells Fargo Express Company.
- Frances Olivia Bowman (1862–1863), who died young.

The "Patriarch of the Methodist Church" died at the age of 96 at his daughter's home in East Orange, New Jersey, on March 3, 1914, and was survived by two daughters and five sons. His remains were interred at the Forest Hill Cemetery in Greencastle, Indiana.

== See also ==
- List of bishops of the United Methodist Church

Religious titles
Preceded by Byron Sunderland	42nd US Senate Chaplain; May 11, 1864 – March 9, 1865	Succeeded by Edgar Harkness Gray
