= Rawson C. Myrick =

American politician (1882–1974)

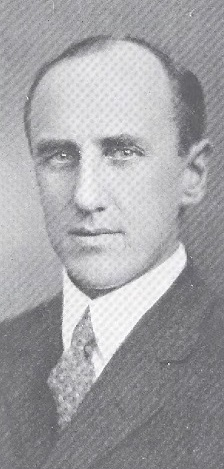
- From the Brattleboro Reformer (Brattleboro, Vermont), May 10, 1938

Secretary of State of Vermont
- In office May 1, 1927 – September 1, 1947
- Governor: John E. Weeks; Stanley C. Wilson; Charles M. Smith; George Aiken; William H. Wills; Mortimer R. Proctor; Ernest W. Gibson Jr.
- Preceded by: Aaron H. Grout
- Succeeded by: Helen Burbank

Deputy Secretary of State of Vermont
- In office March 27, 1909 – April 30, 1927
- Preceded by: Robert J. Slayton
- Succeeded by: Helen Burbank

Personal details
- Born: August 31, 1882 Bridport, Vermont, U.S.
- Died: April 8, 1974 (aged 91) Middlebury, Vermont, U.S.
- Resting place: Green Mount Cemetery, Montpelier, Vermont, U.S.
- Party: Republican
- Spouse(s): Florence Wheelock (m. 1914); Hannah Dvorcef (m. 1925)
- Children: 3
- Education: Burlington Business College
- Occupation: Public official

Rawson C. Myrick (August 31, 1882 – April 8, 1974) was a Vermont businessman and Republican politician who served as Secretary of State of Vermont for 20 years.

== Early life ==
Rawson Clark Myrick was born in Bridport, Vermont on August 31, 1882, the son of Thadius J. and Alice (Fitch) Myrick. He was educated in Bridport, and then taught school while also working on his father's farm.

He attended Burlington Business College, and then accepted a position on the staff of the U.S. Consulate in Three Rivers, Quebec.

Myrick returned to Vermont to work as the personal assistant to Norman S. Foote, a Middlebury real estate broker and property manager. In 1906, he joined the staff of the Vermont Secretary of State. He was promoted to Deputy Secretary of State in 1909, and served in this post until 1927.

== Vermont Secretary of State ==
In May, 1927, Secretary of State Aaron H. Grout resigned, and Governor John E. Weeks appointed Myrick to fill the vacancy. He was elected to a full term in 1928, and was reelected nine times. He served until September 1947, when he resigned. He had already announced that he would not be a candidate for reelection in 1948 when he decided to leave office before the completion of his term as the result of a long period of ill health. Myrick was succeeded by his deputy, Helen Burbank, who was appointed to fill the vacancy. At 20 years, Myrick's tenure as Secretary of State is the longest in Vermont's history; George Nichols served for 19 years.

== Retirement and death ==
In retirement, Myrick resided in Montpelier. He died at Porter Hospital in Middlebury on April 8, 1974, and was buried at Green Mount Cemetery in Montpelier.

== Family ==
In 1914, Myrick married Florence Wheelock (1890–1918). They were the parents of two daughters: Virginia (1915–1955), the wife of Stanley R. Sloan (1911–1975); and Florence (1918–2009), who was the wife of Edward Seager (1918–1985) of South Barre.

In 1925, Myrick married Hannah Dvorcef (1895–1982) of Montpelier. Their son Rawson Jr. died in a 1978 car accident.

== Sources ==
=== Books ===
- Stone, Arthur F. (1929). The Vermont of Today, with its Historic Background, Attractions and People. New York, NY: Lewis Historical Publishing Company. p. 623.

=== Newspapers ===
- "Myrick-Wheelock". Middlebury Register. Middlebury, VT. June 19, 1914. p. 5.
- "Montpelier: Funeral of Mrs, Rawson Myrick". Burlington Free Press. Burlington, VT. December 18, 1918. p. 14.
- "Miss Hanna Dvorcef is Bride of R. C. Myrick". Burlington Free Press. Burlington, VT. February 21, 1925. p. 2.
- "Rawson Myrick, Secretary of State for 20 Years, Resigning". Burlington Free Press. Burlington, VT. Morning News Bureau. August 6, 1947. p. 3.
- "Obituary, Mrs. Stanley R. Sloan". Burlington Free Press. Burlington, VT. November 28, 1955. p. 2.
- "Rawson Myrick Dies, Former State Official". Burlington Free Press. Burlington, VT. April 10, 1974. p. 8 – via Newspapers.com.
- "Obituary, Rawson 'Bud' Myrick Jr". Burlington Free Press. Burlington, VT. November 27, 1978. p. 14.
- "Obituary, Mrs. Hannah Devorcef Myrick". Burlington Free Press. Burlington, VT. January 21, 1982. p. 14.
- "Obituary, Florence M. Seager". Barre Montpelier Times Argus. Barre, VT. November 20, 2009.

Party political offices
Preceded by Aaron H. Grout	Republican nominee for Secretary of State of Vermont; 1928, 1930, 1932, 1934, 1936, 1938, 1940, 1942, 1944, 1946	Succeeded by Howard E. Armstrong
Political offices
Preceded by Aaron H. Grout	Secretary of State of Vermont; 1927–1947	Succeeded by Helen Burbank
