= Edgar Harkness Gray =

American Baptist clergyman (1813–1894)

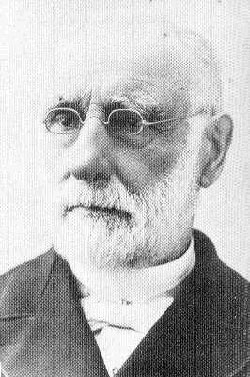
Edgar Harkness Gray

Edgar Harkness Gray (1813–1894) was an American Baptist clergyman who served as Chaplain of the Senate.

== Early years ==
Edgar Harkness Gray was born on November 28, 1813, in Bridport, Vermont, the son of Daniel Gray and his second wife, Mary “Amy” Bosworth. Gray graduated from Colby College (then Waterville College) in 1838. Upon his ordination he became the pastor of the Baptist Church in Freeport, Maine (1839).

== Ministry ==
Following ordination Gray served the Baptist congregations in Freeport, Maine and in Bath, Maine. Thereafter he was pastor of the Baptist church in Shelburne Falls, Massachusetts.

In 1863, Gray was called to the E Street Baptist Church in Washington, D.C., becoming well known. Abraham Lincoln was numbered among his friends. While in Washington, he was elected Chaplain of the Senate, an office he held for four years. Gray was one of the four clergymen who officiated at the funeral services of President Lincoln in Washington. The University of Rochester conferred him the D. D. in 1864.

Gray moved to California, and became the first pastor of a Baptist church in San Francisco. Later he served in the same capacity at the Baptist church in Oakland, California. He was made Superintendent of the Baptist Churches in California, while serving as pastor in Oakland. He was also dean of the Theological Seminary of Oakland.

He died in California in 1894.

== Personal life ==
Edgar Harkness Gray married Mary Jane Rice on December 13, 1838. Their children were Nathaniel Oscar, William Edgar, Mary Ella, Sarah Emma and Augusta Anna Gray.

Religious titles
Preceded by Thomas Bowman	43rd US Senate Chaplain; March 9, 1865 – March 8, 1869	Succeeded by John Philip Newman
