= Joseph J. Bullock =

American chaplain (1812–1892)

46th Chaplain of the United States Senate
- In office March 24, 1879 – December 18, 1883
- President: Rutherford B. Hayes; Chester A. Arthur
- Preceded by: Byron Sunderland
- Succeeded by: Elias DeWitt Huntley

1st Kentucky Superintendent of Public Instruction
- In office 1838–1839
- Preceding: Office established
- Succeeded by: Hubbard Hinde Kavanaugh

Personal details
- Born: December 23, 1812 Fayette County, Kentucky
- Died: November 9, 1892 (aged 79) Lexington, Kentucky
- Education: Centre College; Transylvania University; Princeton Theological Seminary

Joseph James Bullock (December 23, 1812 – November 9, 1892) was a Presbyterian clergyman who served as the first Kentucky Superintendent of Public Instruction from 1838 until 1839, and as Chaplain of the United States Senate from 1879 until 1883.

== Early years ==
Bullock was born on December 23, 1812, in Fayette County, Kentucky, the son of Mary Overton Burch and Walter Bullock. Bullock was educated at Centre College, Kentucky, attended law lectures at Transylvania University in 1833, and went on to study theology at Princeton Theological Seminary, Princeton, New Jersey, 1835–1836.

== Ministry ==
Bullock was licensed to preach in 1836 by West Lexington Presbytery. In December, 1836, the session of First Presbyterian Church of Frankfort, Kentucky, invited Bullock to supply the pulpit for twelve months. Before six months expired, he was called to the pastorate of the church, and in October, 1837, he was ordained and installed in this, his first charge, at the age of twenty-four. Leaders of the city were members of the congregation. Bullock's personality was described as distinguished; physically attractive: "a massive and towering physical frame formed a fit abode for his noble and lofty spirit, and gentleness and strength were exquisitely blended in his countenance and bearing." Bullock continued in office until the summer of 1846, when he was forced by impaired health to resign. During this period, he was also appointed by Governor James Clark to serve as the first Kentucky Superintendent of Public Instruction (1838–39).

In 1848 he became pastor of the church at Walnut Hills, Kentucky and principal of the Female Seminary there. In 1850 he was conferred the degree of D.D. by Centre College. He served as pastor of the Second Presbyterian Church, Louisville, (1853–1855), again as principal of the Walnut Hills Seminary (1856–1860). Bullock accepted calls to Franklin Street Presbyterian Church of Baltimore, Maryland (1861–1870), Second Presbyterian Church, Alexandria, Virginia (1870–1874), and First Presbyterian Church, Alexandria (1874–1880).

== Chaplain of the Senate ==
On March 24, 1879, Bullock was appointed Chaplain of the Senate, a position in which he served until 1883. Bullock was one of fourteen Presbyterians, to date, to serve as Chaplain of the Senate.

== Personal life ==
On October 31, 1832, Joseph J. Bullock married Caroline Laurens Breckenridge, the daughter of Joseph Cabell Breckenridge Sr., and Mary Clay Smith (daughter of Rev. Samuel Stanhope Smith, president of Princeton College, granddaughter of John Witherspoon and a lineal descendant of John Knox). They were the parents of: Waller Robert Bullock, Mary Stanhope Bullock, Cabell Breckinridge Bullock, Frances Breckinridge Bullock, Joseph James Bullock, Letitia Parkhill Bullock, John Milton Bullock, and Sarah Graham Bullock. In 1869, he married secondly Elizabeth T. Lavendar, they were the parents of one son, Wingfield Bullock.

Bullock died on November 9, 1892, in Lexington, Kentucky, while visiting family there.

Religious titles
Preceded by Byron Sunderland	46th US Senate Chaplain; March 24, 1879 – December 18, 1883	Succeeded by Elias DeWitt Huntley
