= Harry H. Cooley =

American farmer and politician

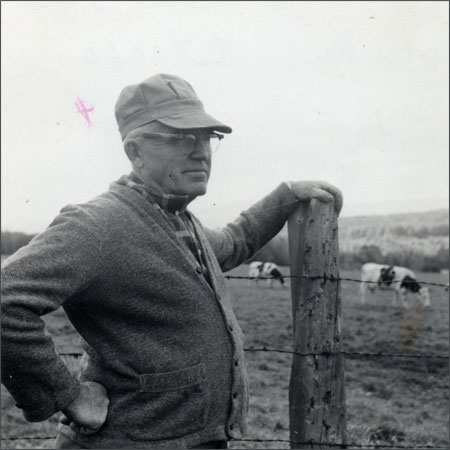
Harry H. Cooley

Harry H. Cooley (November 13, 1893 – October 21, 1986) was a Vermont teacher, farmer and public official who served in the Vermont House of Representatives and as Secretary of State.

== Biography ==
Harry Hale Cooley was born in Georgia, Vermont on November 13, 1893, the son of William A. and Anna (Hale) Cooley. He was educated in the elementary and high schools of Essex Junction, and graduated from the Vermont School of Agriculture and Normal School (now Vermont Technical College) in 1913. After graduating, Cooley taught agriculture, including terms at the high school in Stowe. From 1926 to 1946, he was a member of the faculty at the Vermont School of Agriculture, and taught agricultural science.

Cooley was a resident of Randolph, and operated a farm. A Democrat in an era when the Republican Party dominated Vermont politics, Cooley was active in local politics and government, and served as Randolph's town meeting moderator and lister, in addition to serving on the school board. Cooley also served as chairman of the Orange County Democratic Committee.

From 1941 to 1958, Cooley was supervisor of the White River Soil Conservation District, and he was president of the White River Dairy Cooperative from 1950 to 1960. He served in the Vermont House of Representatives from 1959 to 1961. In 1962 he was an unsuccessful candidate for the Vermont Senate.

In 1964, Cooley won election as Secretary of State as part of that year's Democratic landslide; his victory marked the first time Democrats had ever won the Secretary of State's office. Cooley was reelected in 1966, and served from January 1965 to January 1969. He was an unsuccessful candidate for reelection in 1968.

After leaving office, Cooley served as a volunteer with the federal VISTA program; he taught agriculture and helped supervise farm projects in Arkansas before returning to Vermont in 1970.

Long active with Randolph's historical society, in 1978 Cooley authored a book, Randolph, Vermont: Historical Sketches, to Which Are Appended Reminisces of the Author.

== Death and burial ==
Cooley died in Randolph on October 21, 1986. He was buried at Randolph Center Cemetery in Randolph.

== Family ==
In 1916, Cooley married Gertrude E. Small, also a graduate of what is now Vermont Technical College and a teacher. She died in 1955; in 1957, Cooley married Bernice Lane, who died in 1962.

With his first wife, Cooley was the father of two sons and three daughters: Charles, John, Idora, Ruth, and Marion.

== Sources ==
=== Internet ===
- Lindner, Will (June 29, 1986). "Harry Cooley's View from the Ridge (Reprinted in the Journal of the United States Senate)" (PDF). Journal of the United States Senate for July 25, 1986. Rutland, VT: Rutland Herald. pp. 17770–17771.
- "Harry H. Cooley in Vermont Death Index, 1981-2001". Ancestry.com. Provo, UT: Ancestry.com, LLC. October 21, 1986.
- "Biography, Harry H. Cooley" (PDF). Secretary of State Harry H. Cooley Papers. Montpelier, VT: Vermont Secretary of State. Vermont State Archives. p. 1. Archived from the original (PDF) on 2015-04-02.

=== Books ===
- Cooley, Harry H. (1965). Vermont Legislative Directory and State Manual. Montpelier, VT: Vermont Secretary of State. p. 797.
- Cooley, Harry H. (1978). Randolph, Vermont: Historical Sketches, to Which Are Added Personal Reminiscences of the Author. Randolph, VT: Randolph Town History Committee, Randolph Historical Society. p. Title page.

=== Newspapers ===
- "Cooley Seeks Orange County Senate Post". Burlington Free Press. Burlington, VT. July 31, 1962. p. 3.
- "Orange County Elects Wheatley for Senator". Burlington Free Press. Burlington, VT. November 7, 1962. p. 12.
- "Cooley Given Firsthand Look at New Job". Burlington Free Press. Burlington, VT. November 10, 1964. p. 18.
- Doyle, Mavis (November 10, 1966). "Two Oldest State Officials Put In Busy Days After Victories". Burlington Free Press. Burlington, VT. p. 36.
- "Republicans End Democrats' 6-Year Statehouse Control". Burlington Free Press. Burlington, VT. November 6, 1968. p. 1.
- "Obituary, Harry H. Cooley". Burlington Free Press. Burlington, VT. October 22, 1986. p. 2B.

Party political offices
Preceded by Madelyn Davidson	Democratic nominee for Secretary of State of Vermont; 1964, 1966, 1968	Succeeded by Stuart St. Peter
Political offices
Preceded by Howard E. Armstrong	Secretary of State of Vermont; 1965–1969	Succeeded by Richard C. Thomas
