= Bill Clouse =

American politician

Judge of the 25th Kentucky Circuit Court
- In office November 2008 – April 2018

Judge of the 25th Kentucky District Court
- In office January 3, 1994 – November 2008

Member of the Kentucky Senate from the 22nd district
- In office January 1, 1987 – January 1, 1991
- Preceded by: Robert R. Martin
- Succeeded by: Tom Buford

Personal details
- Born: January 28, 1952 (age 74)
- Party: Democratic

Bill Clouse (born January 28, 1952) is an American politician and judge from Kentucky who was a member of the Kentucky Senate from 1987 to 1991. Clouse was elected in 1986 after incumbent senator Robert R. Martin retired. He was defeated for reelection in 1990 by Republican Tom Buford.

Before his election to the senate, Clouse was the Madison County Attorney from 1979 to 1985. He was elected as a judge of the 25th district court in 1993, and served until he was elected to the 25th circuit court in a 2008 special election. He served as a circuit court judge until he resigned in 2018.
