= Charles B. Boynton =

American university president and politician (1806–1883)

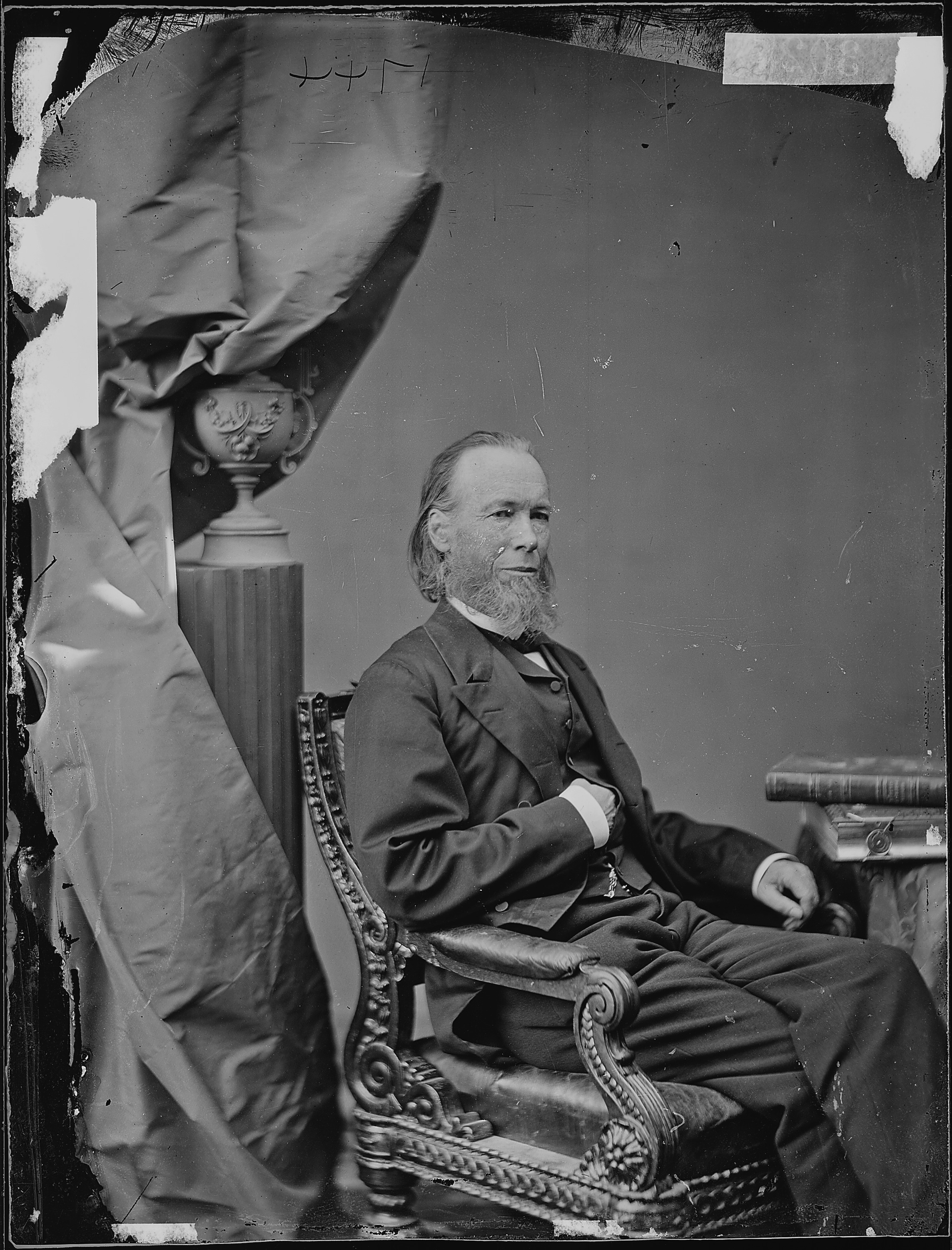
Rev. Charles B. Boynton

Charles Brandon Boynton (1806–1883) was the first president of Howard University and also served as chaplain of the United States House of Representatives.

During his tenure as chaplain of the House of Representatives, Boynton was also the congregational minister of Washington's First Congregational Church, which, at the time, met in the House chamber.

Boynton was the author of A History of the Navy During the Rebellion. The book is about the United States Navy during the American Civil War.

== Sources ==
- Howard University list of presidents
- list of house chaplains

Religious titles
Preceded by William Henry Channing	45th US House Chaplain; December 4, 1865 – March 4, 1869	Succeeded by John George Butler
