= PD 360 =

Educational software

PD 360 is an online library of educational professional development video programs broken into segments. The product was developed by the School Improvement Network, and it has since been renamed Edivate. The segments are topical based with classroom examples featuring various educational experts. PD 360 has increased student achievement in schools in North America.

== Basic Operation ==
PD 360 is an on-demand professional learning system for teachers and educators, with a series of tools built around a library of video segments. The video segments are streamed to the end user in the Flash Video format (FLV). The videos focus on pedagogical topics such as differentiated instruction, English language learners (ELL), instructional strategies, and classroom management. PD 360 is built in Flex, as a Flash application, so Flash is required for its operation.

Observation 360 is a sister product to PD 360 that allows principals and other instructional leaders to do an observation or walkthrough of a teacher using an iPad or iPod Touch. Observation 360 is linked to PD 360.

== History ==
PD 360 version 1 was released in June 2007, following a beta that had been released in November 2006. Version 1 contained basic viewing and searching capability. Version 2 released in November 2007 and added the capability to customize content a viewer sees based on the specific needs of a district. Version 3 was released in November 2008 and added reporting capability so that customers could track and see usage. Version 4 was released in summer of 2009 and added a learning community, with forums and file sharing between users. Version 3.5 was released in November 2009 and added the ability to have colleagues and create membership-based groups, and launched a beta of the achievements program.

== Awards ==
2010 Bronze Telly Award for online video production: High School
2009 Adobe Max Award winner in education: PD 360
2009 Codie awards finalist in the category of Best Professional Development Solution: PD 360
2009 Scholastic Best in Tech Award: PD 360
