= Robert R. Martin (educator) =

Academic

- Martin, c. 1974

Member of the Kentucky Senate from the 22nd district
- In office January 1, 1978 – January 1, 1987
- Preceded by: John F. Lackey
- Succeeded by: Bill Clouse

7th President of Eastern Kentucky University
- In office July 1, 1960 – September 30, 1976
- Preceded by: William F. O'Donnell
- Succeeded by: J.C. Powell

30th Kentucky Superintendent of Public Instruction
- In office 1956–1959
- Preceded by: Wendell P. Butler
- Succeeded by: Wendell P. Butler

Personal details
- Born: December 26, 1910 McKinney, Lincoln County, Kentucky
- Died: November 29, 1997 (aged 86) Richmond, Kentucky
- Resting place: Richmond Cemetery, Richmond, Kentucky
- Party: Democratic
- Education: Eastern Kentucky University (AB); University of Kentucky (MA); Teachers College, Columbia University (EdD)

Military service
- Branch/service: United States Army Air Corps
- Rank: Technical sergeant

Robert Richard Martin (December 27, 1910 – November 29, 1997) was a Kentucky educator and politician. He was the 30th Kentucky Superintendent of Public Instruction in 1955, and served in that role through 1959, then becoming state finance commissioner. Later in 1960, he became the seventh president of Eastern Kentucky State College (which became Eastern Kentucky University in 1966). In 1977, the year after he retired as EKU president, Martin was elected as a Democratic member of the Kentucky Senate, taking office in January 1978 and serving through 1986. He represented Kentucky's 22nd Senate district, which at the time of his election comprised Garrard, Jessamine, Madison, and Mercer counties.

== Early career ==
Martin was born in McKinney, Kentucky, and graduated from Stanford High School in 1930 and Eastern Kentucky State Teachers College in 1934. His family had lost its farm during the Depression, and rented a farm near Richmond so he could commute to Eastern; he raised tobacco to pay his college expenses. He was class president his senior year and lived in a dormitory.

Martin began his career teaching at Sardis High School in Mason County for $80.60 a month. In 1938 he became principal of the county's Orangeburg High School. He joined the U.S Army Air Corps during World War II and was a weather forecaster, achieving the rank of technical sergeant. He returned to Mason County to be principal at Woodleigh Junior High for a short time until he became principal of Lee County High School in Beattyville. In 1948 the state Department of Education hired him as an auditor; he became its finance director and played a role in enacting the state's Minimum Foundation Act for local schools in 1954.

Martin earned his master's degree in education at the University of Kentucky, his doctoral degree at Columbia University in 1951, and married Anne Hoge of Frankfort in 1952.

In 1955, Martin was elected as the 30th Kentucky Superintendent of Public Instruction, winning with 432,410 votes (61.2%) against Republican candidate Verne P. Horne. He assumed office on December 26.

Martin also served as state finance commissioner for Gov. Bert Combs, for whom he had been campaign chair, co-chair and vice-chair; and became the sixth president of Eastern Kentucky State College on July 1, 1960.

== Eastern Kentucky University ==
Martin first focused his attention on a building program, especially on the need for dormitories. Soon after the construction began on the Donovan Building, work began on the Alumni Coliseum, Martin Hall (named after him), Brockton, and the Ault and Gibson buildings. In 1965, the institution underwent major academic reorganization with the creation of five separate colleges and a graduate school which are still prevalent today. The campus got state-of-the-art facilities that are still prominent today. During his tenure the university increased its enrollment from 3,000 to 10,000 and added about $100 million in facilities. After serving as President of Eastern Kentucky University for 16 years, Martin retired on September 30, 1976. He was president of the American Association of State Colleges and Universities in 1971.

== State senator ==
Following his retirement from Eastern, Martin decided to reenter politics and ran for Kentucky's 22nd Senate district seat. Martin won the 1977 Democratic primary against Michael Conover, winning with 7,317 votes (53.4%), and won the 1977 Kentucky Senate election against Republican candidate James C. Murphy, winning with 12,360 votes (63.2%). He would assume office on January 1, 1978.

In 1981, Martin ran for reelection and won the 1981 Democratic primary against challengers John F. Lackey and Marlene Bivins, winning with 7,144 votes (38.5%). Martin was unopposed in the 1981 Kentucky Senate election, winning with 12,519 votes. In all, Martin would serve two full terms in the Kentucky Senate plus an additional year due to a change in the election schedule during his second term.

In 1986, Martin chose not to seek reelection and retired from the Kentucky Senate.

== Later life and honors ==
Martin was one of the first inductees to the Ohio Valley Conference Hall of Fame. Most sports complexes on the EKU campus were established in his tenure. He was married to Anne Hoge, a native of Frankfort, and held a leadership role at the First Presbyterian Church in Richmond. He was elected to a one-year term as president of the State Bank and Trust Company in March 1983. Martin had been a member of the bank board since 1976 when he retired as president. He and his wife established a scholarship for Lincoln County students at EKU.

He remained in Richmond until his passing in 1997. He is buried at the Richmond Cemetery.
