= Jason Glass =

American academic administrator

8th Kentucky Commissioner of Education
- In office September 2020 – September 29, 2023
- Preceded by: Kevin C. Brown (interim)
- Succeeded by: Robin Kinney Fields (interim)

Director of the Iowa Department of Education
- In office 2010–2013

Personal details
- Education: University of Kentucky; Seton Hall University

Jason E. Glass is an American academic administrator serving as the associate vice president of teaching and learning at Western Michigan University since 2023. He was the commissioner of the Kentucky Department of Education from 2020 to 2023. Glass previously worked as the director of the Iowa Department of Education from 2010 to 2013 and superintendent of Jefferson County Public Schools in Colorado from 2017 to 2020. As of July 1, He currently serves as the Superintendent In the Palo Alto Unified School District in Palo Alto, California.

== Life ==
Glass was raised in Brandenburg, Kentucky. He earned a B.A. (1994) in political science and history, M.A. (1996) in education, and a M.A. (2007) in political science from the University of Kentucky. In 2011, he earned a doctor of education in educational leadership from Seton Hall University. His dissertation was titled, The Influence of Teacher Motivation in the Context of Performance-Based Compensation.

Glass served as the vice president of quality ratings with Qualistar Early Learning. He held several posts with the Colorado Department of Education and worked as a university instructor and high school teacher in Kentucky. From 2007 to 2010, Glass was the director of human resources and director of research and assessment of the Eagle County, Colorado school district. He held positions within the Colorado Department of Education. He was later the senior director of human capital strategy at Battelle for Kids in 2010. Glass was the director of the Iowa Department of Education from 2010 to 2013 under governor Terry Branstad. From 2013 to 2017, he served as the superintendent of Eagle County Public Schools. In 2016, U.S. president Barack Obama nominated Glass to join the board of directors of the National Board for Education Sciences.

On July 1, 2017, Glass became the superintendent of Jefferson County Public Schools. He left the position in September 2020 to become the commissioner of the Kentucky Department of Education. He stepped down from the role on September 29, 2023, to become the associate vice president of teaching and learning Western Michigan University.
