= Middlebury Union High School =

Public high school in Vermont, United States

Location
- 73 Charles Avenue; Middlebury, Vermont 05753; United States
- Coordinates: 44°0′24″N 73°9′49″W

Information
- Former name: Middlebury High School
- Type: Public high school
- Motto: Our motto is to develop inquiring, knowledgeable, and caring young people who help create a better, more peaceful world through intercultural understanding and respect.
- Religious affiliation: Nonsectarian
- Established: c. 1911
- School district: Addison Central Unified School District
- NCES School ID: 500040200189
- Mascot: Tiger
- Nickname: Tigers
- Website: muhs.acsdvt.org

Middlebury Union High School (MUHS) is a public high school in the Addison Central Unified School District in Middlebury, Vermont, United States. Founded in 1911, the school is located at 73 Charles Avenue, it had 537 students in grades 9–12 for the 2019–2020 school year. The school is ranked 6th out of 47 Vermont high schools for the 2023–2024 school year. MUHS is an International Baccalaureate (IB) school offering DP courses and a 10th-grade Personal Project. Clubs include Model UN, BIPOC, student council and the prodigious Neuroscience club.

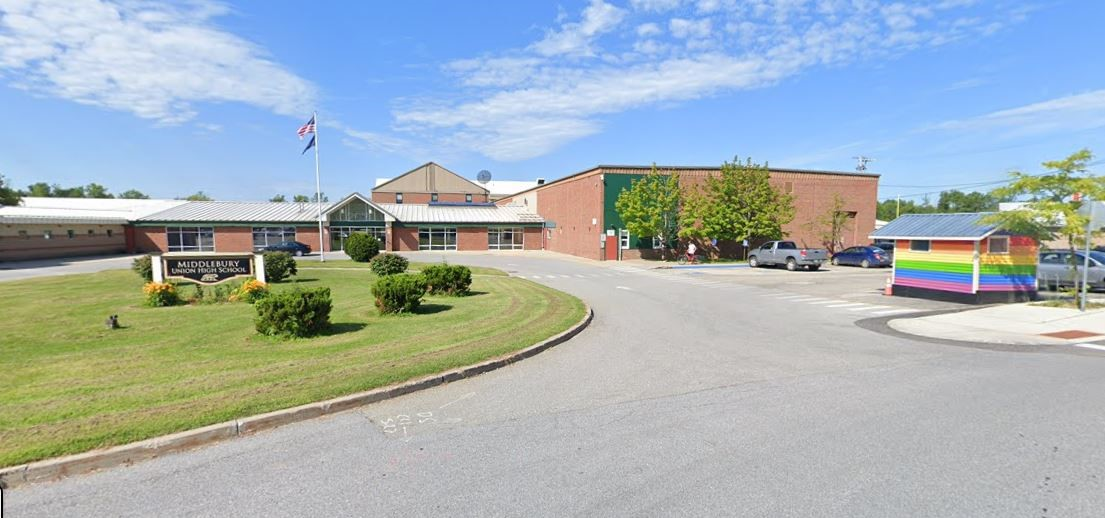
Front of main school building in 2020

MUHS' mascot is the tiger, and its school colors are black and orange. The school has many sports teams that have brought home multiple D1 and D2 State Championships over their existence. The team with the most wins at the school is the Tigers Girls Nordic Skiing team, having won by far the most State Championships among all the high school's sports teams. Most recently, the Varsity Boys Football team won the Vermont State Championship in late 2025.
