= Richard C. Thomas =

American politician

Richard C. Thomas (May 3, 1937—November 2, 1991) was an American politician and government official who served four terms as Secretary of State of Vermont.

== Early life ==
Richard Clark Thomas was born in Washburn, Maine on May 3, 1937. He was raised in Rutland, Vermont, and was a graduate of Rutland High School. Thomas graduated from Middlebury College in 1959. He completed the Reserve Officers' Training Corps program, and served as an officer in the United States Army Reserve; he was a member of the Field Artillery branch, and attained the rank of captain.

Thomas attended Georgetown University Law Center for a year, and was a reporter and writer for the F. W. Dodge Corporation from 1960 to 1963. From 1963 to 1965 he worked on the staff of Senator Winston L. Prouty as a research assistant, campaign coordinator, and press secretary. Thomas was executive director of the Vermont Republican Party from 1965 to 1968. In 1968 he was appointed first assistant clerk of the Vermont House of Representatives.

== Secretary of state ==
In 1968, Thomas was the successful Republican nominee for Secretary of State of Vermont. He was reelected three times, and served from January 1969 to January 1977. He was an unsuccessful candidate for a fifth term in 1976, and was defeated by Democrat James A. Guest.

== Later career ==
After leaving office, Thomas was a resident of Woodbridge, Virginia and was employed as the state liaison for the Federal Election Commission. At the FEC, he was responsible for coordinating the agency's work with state and local election officials. In addition, he oversaw compilation of the FEC's annual Combined Federal and State Disclosure Directory, as well as reports on the results of federal elections.

== Death ==
Thomas died of throat cancer in Falls Church, Virginia on November 2, 1991. He was buried at Saint Sylvester Cemetery in Websterville, Vermont.

== Family ==
Thomas was married to Patricia L. McGlynn. They were the parents of a son, Richard, and two daughters, Lisa and Leslie.

== Sources ==
=== Newspaper ===
- Clarke, Rod (November 3, 1976). "Alden Leads Buckley: Snelling, Stafford, Jeffords, Diamond and Guest Victorious". Bennington Banner. Bennington, VT. United Press International. p. 1.
- "FEC Official R.C. Thomas Dies at 54". Washington Post. Washington, DC. November 4, 1991.
- "Former Vt. Politician Dies at 54". Burlington Free Press. Burlington, VT. Associated Press. November 5, 1991. p. 11.
- "Obituary, Richard C. Thomas". Rutland Herald. Rutland, VT. November 7, 1991 – via Newspapers.com.

=== Internet ===
- "In Memoriam, Richard Clark Thomas" (PDF). Federal Elections Commission Record. Washington, DC. December 1, 1991. p. 3.
- "Biography, Richard C. Thomas" (PDF). Vermont State Archives. Montpelier, VT: Vermont Secretary of State. p. 1.

=== Magazines ===
- "In Memoriam, Richard C. Thomas". Middlebury College Magazine. Middlebury, VT: Middlebury College. 1992. p. 78.

Party political offices
Preceded by Byron C. Hathorn	Republican nominee for Secretary of State of Vermont; 1968, 1970, 1972, 1974, 1976	Succeeded by Robert H. Gibson
Political offices
Preceded by Harry H. Cooley	Secretary of State of Vermont; 1969–1977	Succeeded by James A. Guest
