= Admiral Moore =

Admiral Moore may refer to:

== United Kingdom ==
- Arthur Moore (Royal Navy officer) (1847–1934), British Royal Navy admiral
- Gordon Moore (Royal Navy officer) (1862–1934), British Royal Navy admiral
- Graham Moore (Royal Navy officer) (1764–1843), British Royal Navy admiral
- Henry Ruthven Moore (1886–1978), British Royal Navy admiral
- Sir John Moore, 1st Baronet (1718–1779), British Royal Navy admiral
- Simon Moore (Royal Navy officer) (born 1946), British Royal Navy rear admiral
- Thomas Edward Laws Moore (1820–1872), British Royal Navy rear admiral

== United States ==
- Charles Brainard Taylor Moore (1853–1923), U.S. Navy rear admiral
- Charles Johnes Moore (1889–1974), U.S. Navy rear admiral
- Charles W. Moore Jr. (born 1946), U.S. Navy vice admiral
- John White Moore (1832–1913), U.S. Navy rear admiral
- Nathan A. Moore (fl. 1990s–2020s), U.S. Coast Guard rear admiral
- Scott P. Moore (born 1960), U.S. Navy rear admiral
- Thomas Moore (admiral) (born 1959), U.S. Navy vice admiral

== Other ==
- George Dunbar Moore (1893–1979), Royal Australian Navy rear admiral
