= Eastern High School (Washington, D.C.) =

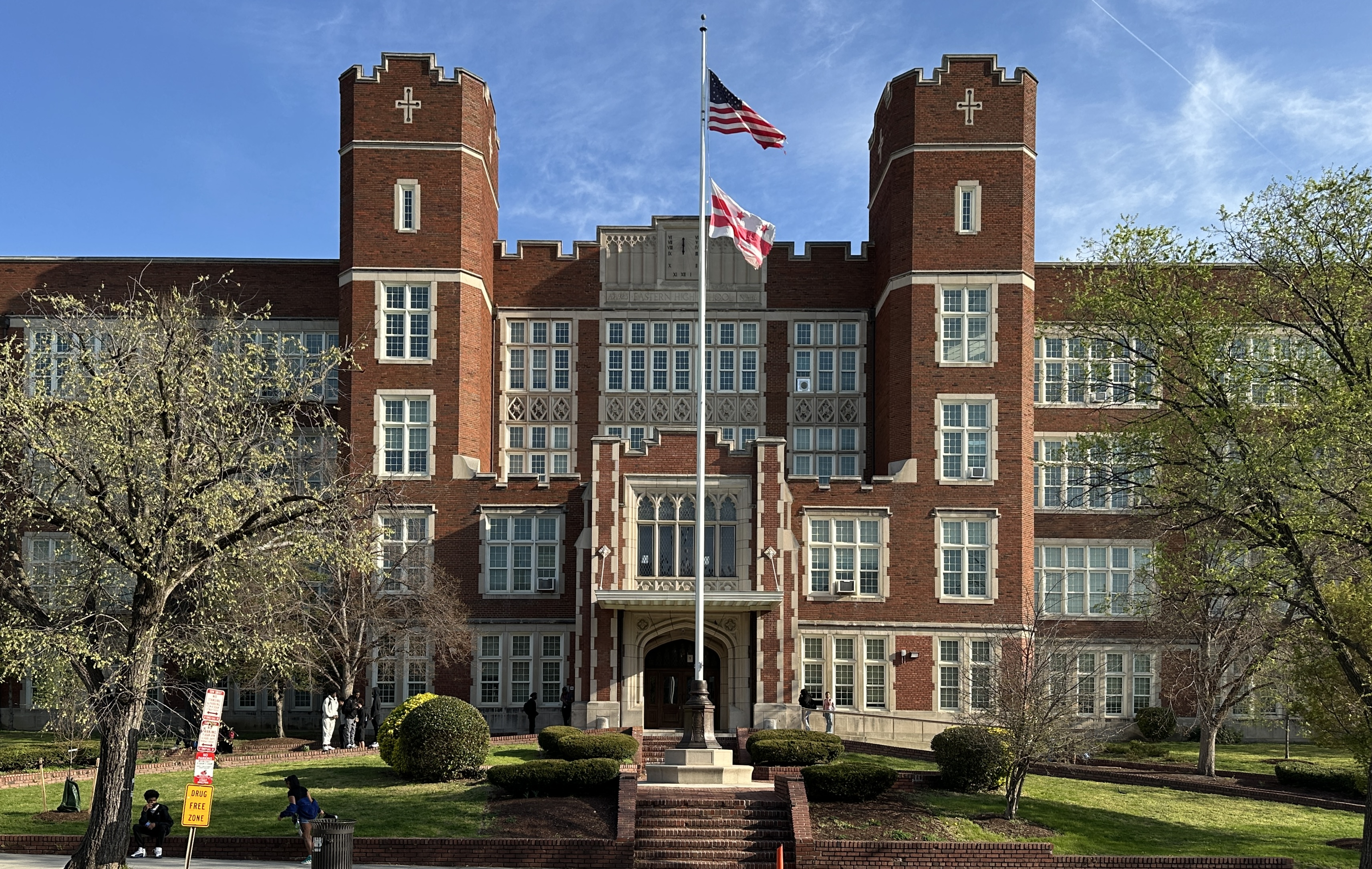

Location
- 1700 East Capitol Street NE; Washington, D.C. 20003; United States; 38°53′26″N 76°58′49″W

Information
- Former name: Capitol Hill High School
- School type: Public high school
- Motto: The Pride of Capitol Hill
- Established: 1890 (136 years ago)
- Status: Open
- School board: District of Columbia State Board of Education
- School district: District of Columbia Public Schools Ward 7
- NCES District ID: 1100030
- School code: DC-001-457
- CEEB code: 090060
- NCES School ID: 110003000078
- Principal: Benjamin Williams
- Faculty: 56.00 (on an FTE basis)
- Grades: 9 to 12
- Enrollment: 909 (2024–2025)
  - Grade 9: 318
  - Grade 10: 245
  - Grade 11: 176
  - Grade 12: 170
- Student to teacher ratio: 13.40
- Campus type: Urban
- Colors: Blue and white
- Mascot: Ramblers
- USNWR ranking: 11,029
- Newspaper: The Easterner
- Information: Metro Stop: Stadium-Armory
- Website: easternhighschooldcps.org
- Eastern High School
- U.S. National Register of Historic Places
- D.C. Inventory of Historic Sites
- Location within the District of Columbia
- Built: 1923
- Architects: Snowden Ashford, Albert L. Harris
- Architectural style: Collegiate Gothic Revival
- MPS: Public School Buildings of Washington, DC MPS
- NRHP reference No.: 100009489

Significant dates
- Added to NRHP: October 30, 2023
- Designated DCIHS: August 3, 2023

Eastern High School is a public high school in Washington, D.C. It serves grades 9 through 12 as part of the District of Columbia Public Schools. Located at the intersection of 17th Street and East Capitol Street NE, the school is situated along the border of the Kingman Park and Hill East neighborhoods. It is one of the oldest continuously operating high schools in the District of Columbia. The campus is listed on the National Register of Historic Places.

Opened in 1923, the campus sits one mile east of the United States Capitol along East Capitol Street, placing it on the Capitol's east-west axis. Since 2013, Eastern High School has offered the International Baccalaureate program.

== History ==
=== Early years ===
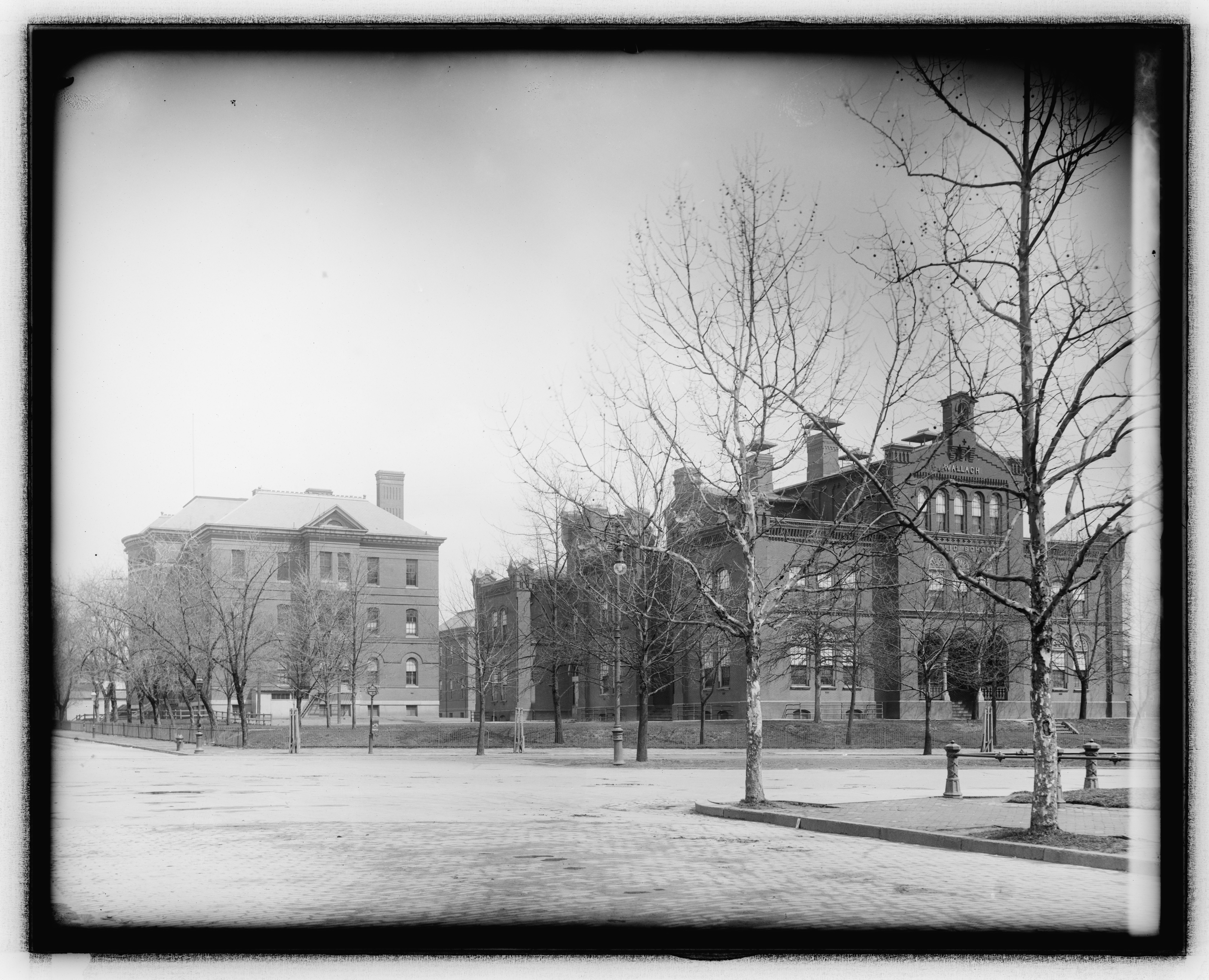
Old Eastern High School at 7th and C Streets S.E.

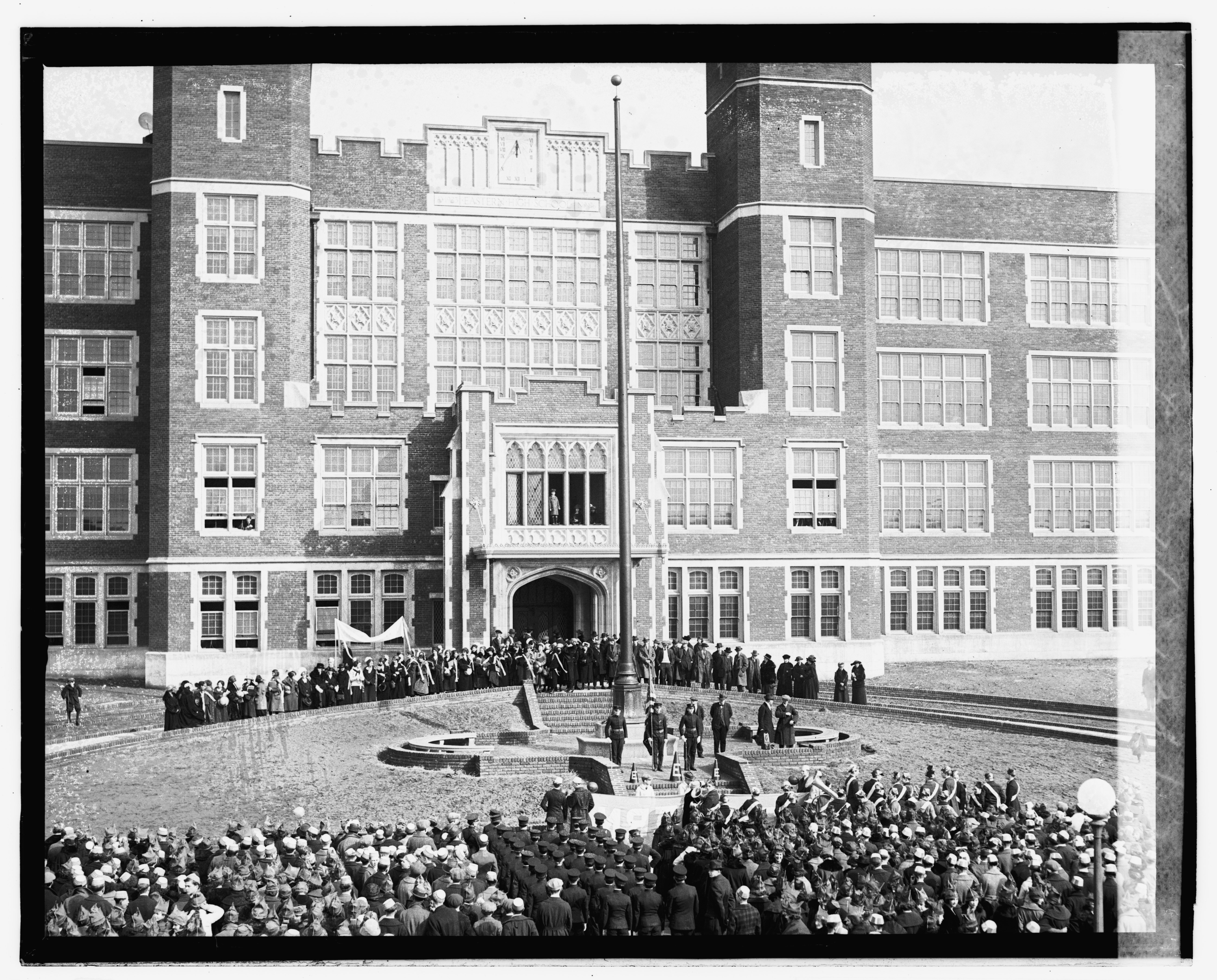
The new Eastern High School grand opening 1923

Eastern High School, as it is known today, was founded in 1890 as Capitol Hill High School. It was established in the Peabody Elementary School building at 5th and C Streets NE. The school served an all-white student body of 170 students and a teaching staff of 7. As time progressed, the school gained popularity, prompting its relocation to a larger site at the old Wallach school building at 7th and C Streets S.E. in 1892. Alongside the move, the school changed its name to Eastern High School, and its student body continued to expand. In 1909, the community rallied to construct a new school building, ultimately selecting the current location in 1914–1915. However, the onset of World War I caused a delay in the construction process.

Snowden Ashford, a municipal architect, was chosen to create the blueprint for the new school. The Eastern Alumni Association strongly encouraged Ashford to deviate from his preferred Elizabethan and Collegiate Gothic style and instead design the new school in the more popular Colonial Revival style. However, Ashford's vision ultimately prevailed. He completed the designs for the school in 1921 and subsequently resigned from his position as Municipal Architect. Eastern High School became the last public school in the District to be constructed in the Collegiate Gothic style. Albert L. Harris, who succeeded Ashford, oversaw the final design and construction of the school.

The new Eastern High School building, built by the Charles H. Tompkins Company Incorporated in 1923, was situated at 17th and East Capitol Streets N.E. Charles R. Hart, who was principal of Eastern High School from 1918 to 1945, led the school during the construction of its new building. In memory of the alums who died in the Spanish-American War and World War I, a memorial flagstaff was erected in front of the building. The monument features a bronze bell at its base, manufactured by Tiffany & Co., which has been estimated to be worth a million dollars.

Following Eastern High School's relocation to its new campus, the former Wallach School building was repurposed as the home of Hine Junior High School.At its new campus, Eastern's student enrollment grew to more than 1,000 students. As the surrounding neighborhood of Eastern High School continued to grow, the school's capacity reached 3,000 students by 1934. To address the overcrowding issue, students who lived east of the Anacostia River were redirected to Anacostia High School.

=== Subsequent Years ===
In 1954, the U.S. Supreme Court made a significant decision regarding the desegregation of public schools. Specifically, in the case of Bolling vs. Sharpe, the court declared that the practice of racial segregation within the DC public school system was unconstitutional, as it violated the Due Process Clause of the Fifth Amendment. Consequently, new school boundaries were established to address this issue. Subsequently, in the autumn of 1954, the first African-American students who had previously attended Cardozo (Central) and Spingarn High Schools were transferred to Eastern, resulting in an African-American student population of 1.4%. However, within a span of ten years, Eastern transformed, with the African-American student population reaching an overwhelming majority of 99%.

During the 1960s, significant milestones took place at Eastern High School, primarily involving its African-American student population. In 1964, Mr. Madison W. Tignor became the first African-American principal to serve Eastern. Recognizing the lack of curriculum that represented the Black experience and culture, students formed a collective called the Modern Strivers. In 1968, with community support, they founded the Freedom School, which employed committed educators. This institution offered Eastern students the chance to participate in classes off-campus that focused on Black History and culture in addition to their regular coursework.

=== Late 20th Century ===
In the 1980s, Eastern High School underwent its first major modernization project. The renovations included the installation of new windows, fire doors, flooring, restrooms, stairwells, and parabolic troffer lighting in classrooms. Interior corridors were repainted, the school's historic brick flooring was restored, the auditorium was renovated, and the elevator was modernized. Significant improvements were also made to the gymnasium; however, an arson fire on July 16, 1984, caused approximately $1 million in damage and delayed the project's completion by two years.

Ralph H. Neal served as principal of Eastern High School from 1984 to 1997, making him one of the school's longest-serving principals. During his tenure, he emphasized academic standards, student discipline, and campus safety while fostering strong relationships with students and staff. Following his service at Eastern, Neal joined the central administration of the District of Columbia Public Schools (DCPS), where he served as an assistant superintendent. He has been recognized by many alumni as "Principal for Life" for his long tenure and leadership at the school.

Eastern High School has maintained a strong tradition in music, particularly through its marching band and choir programs. The school's Blue and White Marching Machine has performed on national stages, including presidential inaugurations. Under the direction of Dr. Joyce Garrett, the Eastern High School choir performed at major national events attended by Presidents Ronald Reagan, Bill Clinton, George H. W. Bush, and George W. Bush. The choir has also appeared on televised programs, provided backup vocals for recording artists, participated in international tours, and received recognition in competitions. In 1986 and 1987, the choir won first place in the National High School Gospel Competition in New York. In 1988, it earned a silver medal after placing second at the International Youth Music Festival in Vienna, Austria

On March 8, 1994, senior student Jerome Cooke was shot by fellow student Cornell Cheeks Jr. outside the school’s cafeteria during the lunch period. Cooke survived the attack after receiving emergency cardiopulmonary resuscitation (CPR) from a school official. Cheeks Jr. was later arrested and charged with assault with intent to kill.

In 1997, President Bill Clinton with Vice President Al Gore visited Eastern.

=== 21st Century ===
During the 2000s, Eastern High School experienced a substantial decline in enrollment. After serving nearly 2,000 students roughly a decade earlier, enrollment fell to fewer than 800 students. The decline was attributed to several factors, including the expansion of charter schools, demographic changes within the District of Columbia, and declining public confidence in the school. During this period, Eastern also experienced administrative instability, with six principals serving over a seven-year span. The sustained decline in enrollment prompted discussions about the school's long-term viability and raised the possibility of closure.

In the late 2000s, Eastern High School was selected as part of the District of Columbia Public Schools restructuring and modernization project. The project resulted in a $77 million renovation of the historic campus, which was complete in August 2010. The school reopened in the fall of 2011 to incoming ninth-grade students and expanded by one grade level each subsequent year.Eastern graduated its first post-modernization class in 2015. In 2013, the school was designated an International Baccalaureate (IB) World School, and it awarded its first IB diplomas to graduates in 2015.

In 2023, Eastern High School celebrated its centennial at its East Capitol Street campus. During the anniversary year, the school was nominated for and added to the National Register of Historic Places and the District of Columbia Inventory of Historic Sites. Additionally, The Story of Our Schools, a Washington, D.C.-based nonprofit organization that empowers students to research and document their schools’ histories, curated a permanent museum-quality exhibit in the school’s lobby. The Eastern High School Alumni Association also held a special ceremony to induct notable alumni and faculty members into the Eastern Hall of Fame.

== Admissions ==
=== Attendance Boundaries ===
In 2021, following the District of Columbia's ward boundary redistricting, Eastern High School was reassigned from Ward 6 to Ward 7. The school's attendance boundaries and feeder patterns remained unchanged.

Neighborhoods within Eastern's boundaries include Capitol Hill, Navy Yard, Hill East, Kingman Park, Near Northeast and Southwest Waterfront.

=== Feeder patterns ===
The following elementary schools feed into Eastern:

- Amidon-Bowen Elementary School
- Brent Elementary School
- J.O. Wilson Elementary School
- Ludlow-Taylor Elementary School
- Maury Elementary School
- Miner Elementary School
- Payne Elementary School
- Shirley Chisholm Elementary School
- Van Ness Elementary School

The following middle schools feed into Eastern:

- Eliot-Hine Middle School
- Jefferson Middle School Academy
- Kelly Miller Middle School

The Capitol Hill Cluster School (CHCS) is a multi-campus school within the District of Columbia Public Schools. Serving students PreK3 through 8th grade, its campuses feed into Eastern High School. The CHCS campuses include :

- Peabody Elementary School
- Watkins Elementary School
- Stuart-Hobson Middle School

The following K-8 schools feed into Eastern:

- Browne Education Campus
- Capitol Hill Montessori School @ Logan

== Athletics ==
The school offers ten different athletic programs.

- Baseball
- Basketball
- Cheerleading
- Cross Country
- Football
- Golf
- Softball
- Swimming
- Track and field
- Volleyball

== Notable alumni ==
Eastern has had many notable alumni in academia, the arts, entertainment, journalism, media, the military, government, politics, and sports.

=== Academics ===
- Maude E. Aiton, educator
- Calvin Beale, demographer
- Alvin C. Graves, nuclear physicist
- Gilbert Hunt, mathematician
- Mary Eleanor Spear, data vision specialist who pioneered development of the box chart and box plot
- Ibrahim K. Sundiata, scholar of West-African and African American history
- Betty Lee Sung, activist, author, and scholar of Asian American studies

=== Arts and entertainment ===
- Gayle Adams, musician best known for her disco hit singles Your Love Is A Life Saver, Stretch'in Out and Love Fever
- Monta Bell, film director, producer, screenwriter
- Dave Chappelle (attended, did not graduate), actor, comedian
- The Choice Four, all-male vocal group
- Y'Anna Crawley, singer and songwriter who was a season two winner of the BET gospel singing competition show Sunday Best
- Pat Flaherty (attended, did not graduate), actor, athlete
- Kevin LeVar, singer, songwriter
- DJ Kool, disc jockey and rapper best known for his 1996 hit single Let Me Clear My Throat
- Bert Sadler, photographer
- Frank Wright, American painter, professor of art at George Washington University

=== Government, politics and law ===
- Sheila Abdus-Salaam, New York Court of Appeals judge
- Vernon D. Acree, former commissioner of the United States Customs Service
- Bennett Champ Clark, former United States Senator from Missouri
- Gail Cobb (attended, did not graduate), D.C. Metropolitan Police officer who the first female officer in the United States to be killed in the line of duty
- Isaac Fulwood, Chief of the Metropolitan Police Department of the District of Columbia (1989–1992)
- Calvin H. Gurley, District of Columbia perennial candidate
- George Huddleston Jr., former member of United States House of Representatives from Alabama
- Franklin McCain, civil rights activist, member of the Greensboro Four
- Edna G. Parker, United States tax court judge
- Jane Menefee Schutt, civil rights activist
- Gladys Spellman (attended, did not graduate), educator, former United States Representative
- Brandon Todd, former District of Columbia Councilman
- Helen Louise Trembley, entomologist at the USDA and the National Institutes of Health

=== Media and journalism ===
- George D. Beveridge, journalist
- Stephen Early, White House Press Secretary who served under President's Franklin D. Roosevelt and Harry S.Truman
- Eleni Epstein, fashion journalist
- Jackie Martin, photojournalist
- Andy Ockershausen, former Washington area radio executive at WMAL-FM
- Eugene Scott, political journalist

=== Military and public service ===
- George S. Blanchard, U.S. Army general
- Lester A. Dessez, U.S. Marine Corps general
- Alexander D. Goode, U.S. Army chaplain who was one of the Four Chaplains killed in the line of duty
- Cecil D. Haney, retired U.S. Navy admiral
- Ernest E. Harmon, aviator
- Charles T. Lanham, U.S. Army general
- Anthony McAuliffe, U.S. Army general
- Earle Wheeler, U.S. Army general

=== Sports ===
- Robin Campbell (attended, did not graduate), U.S. Olympic sprinter
- Jerry Chambers, former NBA small forward for the Los Angeles Lakers, Phoenix Suns, Atlanta Hawks, Buffalo Braves, San Diego Conquistadors and the San Antonio Spurs
- Al Chesley, former NFL linebacker for the Philadelphia Eagles and Chicago Bears
- Frank Chesley, former NFL linebacker for the Green Bay Packers
- Vince Colbert, former MLB pitcher for the Cleveland Indians
- Mark Johnson, former boxer
- Jimmy Jones, former wide receiver for NFL's Chicago Bears and AFLs Denver Broncos
- Gilbert Kelly, football player
- Mike Martin, former NFL wide receiver for the Cincinnati Bengals
- Charles Mooney, retired Olympic boxer
- Josh Morgan (attended, did not graduate), former NFL wide receiver for the San Francisco 49ers, Washington Redskins, Chicago Bears and New Orleans Saints
- Art Perry, former NCAA coach
- Jamorko Pickett, NBA G League player
- James Ratiff, basketball player
- Thomas Robinson (attended, did not graduate), basketball player
- Kelvin Scarborough, basketball player
- Dallas Shirley, basketball referee
- John Smith, MLB utility player for the Boston Red Sox
- Mike Wilcher, former NFL linebacker for the Los Angeles Rams and San Diego Chargers

== Notable faculty ==
- Regis Louise Boyle, taught and advised journalism at Eastern from 1942 to 1955
- Linda W. Cropp, District of Columbia councilmember (1991–1997), first female chair of the Council of the District of Columbia (1997–2007)
- Georgia Mills Jessup, American painter and sculptor who taught art
- Patrick Lundy, singer, songwriter
- Charles Mooney, Eastern alumnus and retired boxer who won a silver medal in the boxing tournament at the 1976 Summer Olympics in Montreal, Quebec, Canada
- Dallas Shirley, basketball referee who was inducted into the Basketball Hall of Fame in 1980
