= Mary Edmunds =

Mary Edmunds may refer to:

- Mary Ellen Edmunds (born 1940), American religious public speaker, author and nurse
- Mary Anne Edmunds (1813–1858), Welsh educator

== See also ==
- Mary Edmonds (1922–2005), American biochemist
