= Trembley =

Trembley is a surname. Notable people with the surname include:

- Abraham Trembley (1710–1784), Genevan naturalist
- Dave Trembley (born 1951), American professional baseball executive
- Helen Louise Trembley (1905–1983), American entomologist
- Jean Trembley (1749–1811), Genevan mathematician
- John Trembley (born 1952), American swimmer and college swimming head coach
- Nicolas Trembley (born 1965), Paris- and Geneva-based curator, art critic, art advisor and writer
- William B. Trembley (1877–1952), United States Army soldier awarded the Medal of Honor

== See also ==
- Tremblay (disambiguation)
