= Governor Moore =

Governor Moore may refer to:

- A. Harry Moore (1879–1952), 39th Governor of New Jersey
- Andrew B. Moore (1807–1873), 16th Governor of Alabama
- Arch A. Moore Jr. (1923–2015), 28th and 30th Governor of West Virginia
- Charles Brainard Taylor Moore (1853–1923), Naval Governor of American Samoa from 1905 to 1908
- Charles C. Moore (1866–1958), 13th Governor of Idaho
- Charles Moore, 1st Marquess of Drogheda (1730–1822), Governor of County Meath in 1759 and Governor of Kinsale and Charles Fort in 1765
- Dan K. Moore (1906–1986), 66th Governor of North Carolina
- Gabriel Moore (1785–1845), 5th Governor of Alabama
- Henry Monck-Mason Moore (1887–1964), 1st Governor-General of Ceylon
- Sir Henry Moore, 1st Baronet (1713–1769), Acting Governor of Jamaica, and royal Governor of the Province of New York from 1765 to 1769
- James Moore Sr. (c. 1650–1706), governor of Carolina from 1700 to 1703
- James Moore Jr. (c. 1682–1724), governor of South Carolina from 1719 to 1721
- John Isaac Moore (1856–1937), Acting Governor of Arkansas in 1907
- Marshall F. Moore (1829–1870), 7th Governor of Washington Territory
- Miles Conway Moore (1845–1919), 14th Governor of Washington Territory
- Samuel B. Moore (1789–1846), 6th Governor of Alabama
- Thomas Overton Moore (1804–1876), 16th Governor of Louisiana
  - CSS Governor Moore - American Civil War gunboat named after Thomas Overton Moore
- Wes Moore (born 1978), 63rd Governor of Maryland since 2023
- William Moore (Pennsylvania politician, died 1793) (1735–1793), 4th President of Pennsylvania

== See also ==
- Richard More (cricketer) (1879–1936), Governor of Khartoum Province from 1913 to 1920
