= Charles Johnes Moore =

United States Navy officer

- Born: December 19, 1889; Decatur, Illinois, U.S.
- Died: February 4, 1974 (aged 84); Bethesda, Maryland, U.S.
- Relatives: BG Jesse H. Moore, (grandfather); RADM Charles B. T. Moore, (father); RADM Sumner Kittelle, (father-in-law); BG Lester A. Dessez, (brother-in-law)
- Military career
- Allegiance: United States
- Branch: United States Navy
- Service years: 1910–1947
- Rank: Rear Admiral
- Commands: Chief of Staff, Fifth Fleet
- Conflicts: World War I World War II
- Awards: Navy Cross; Distinguished Service Medal; Legion of Merit

Charles Johnes ‘Carl' Moore (December 19, 1889 – February 4, 1974) was a Rear Admiral of the United States Navy. He was the chief of staff of Raymond A. Spruance, commander of the Fifth Fleet, during the most important and significant naval campaigns of the World War II in the Pacific Theater: the Gilberts, the Marshalls and the Marianas.

Moore described himself as “being free and willing to express views, and that’s what [Spruance] wanted.” Spruance and Moore's operations officer, Emmet Forrestel, recalled that, “Anything you wanted to know about planning, Carl Moore had at his fingertips. He was the backbone of the staff.”

After leaving the Fifth Fleet for Washington, he served the Joint Chiefs of Staff as deputy secretary. He retired in the rank of Rear Admiral on January 1, 1947.

== Early life and education ==
Moore was born the son of Helen Johnes and Charles Brainard Taylor Moore on December 19, 1889, in Decatur, Illinois. His grandfather Jesse H. Moore was a brigadier general with distinction in the civil war and later became a member of congress. His father Charles B. T. Moore served as lieutenant during the American-Spanish War and had raised the first flag of U.S. over Guam on the occasion of the take-over of the government by Navy Department on January 23, 1899. In 1915, after the long service in the navy, Rear Admiral Charles B. T. Moore was retired.

Moore attended Annapolis Naval Academy in 1906 and graduated with the class of 1910. He was also known for being a violinist of Metzenberger Orchestra.

== Career prior to World War II ==
Moore's seagoing career started as engineer of the destroyer Bainbridge. During World War I, he served extensively in destroyers and was awarded the Navy Cross for heroism as Commanding Officer of the Destroyer Downes, (DD-45). Between the wars he had duty as executive officer to the destroyer Altair and the battleship New York, and he command several destroyers as well as Destroyer Division 5. His shore duty during these years included tours in the Navy Department and the Naval War College. He lived in Newport from 1934 to 1937 while serving on the staff of the War College, and he had been a frequent visitor since that time. During his time in Newport, Moore became the assistant to Spruance in Tactics Department. From 1937 to 1939 he was on the Staff of Commander, Battle Force, U.S. Fleet.

== World War II ==
At the outbreak of World War II, Moore was in command of the Cruiser Philadelphia on Atlantic convoy duty since September 5, 1941. Because of the stranding, Moore had failed selection for admiral and traveled back to Washington on August 15, 1942. He served on a senior member of the Joint U.S. of Strategic and the Joint War Plans committees with the Joint Chiefs of Staff until 1943 received a letter of Spruance which asked him to be his chief of staff. From August 1943 he had duty to Admiral Spruance. He was with Spruance and instrumental in the planning and execution of the Gilbert, Marshalls and Marianas campaigns in 1943 and 1944.

However, the experience of being stranded affected his hope of flag rank. After the Gilberts campaign, Spruance wrote an official letter to Nimitz recommending that Moore be promoted. Nimitz agreed and forwarded the letter to Ernest King, but the latter would not approve his promotion. Moore then returned to Washington and was again with the Joint Chiefs of Staff as deputy secretary. In that capacity he took part in the Potsdam Conference of 1945.

== Postwar ==
Moore retired in the rank of rear admiral on January 1, 1947 on account of age. After his retirement, Moore became a fellow of Brookings Institution in Washington and worked there with the international studies groups until 1955.

In 1965 Moore acted as Spruance’s alter ego so that some kind of record could be preserved of Spruance’s naval career in Columbia University Oral History Collection. His subsequent oral history comprises five volumes totaling 1245 pages.

He lived in Chevy Chase, Maryland, until his death on February 4, 1974. He died at the Naval Hospital in Bethesda, Moore was buried at Arlington National Cemetery alongside his wife Anna Louise Kittelle Moore (1890-1990), the daughter of Rear admiral Sumner Ely Wetmore Kittelle, Commanding Officer of the U.S.S. Georgia during World War I.

== Personal life ==
Moore married Anna Louise Kittelle, and they had three children.

== Decorations and Awards ==
- Navy Cross: for distinguished service in the line of his profession as Commanding Officer of the U.S.S. DOWNES, engaged in the important, exacting and hazardous duty of patrolling the waters infested with enemy submarines and mines, in escorting and protecting vitally important convoys of troops and supplies through these waters, and in offensive and defensive action, vigorously and unremittingly prosecuted against all forms of enemy naval activity during World War I.
- Naval Distinguished Service Medal: Bureau of Naval Personnel Information Bulletin No. 349 (April 1946). ... for exceptionally meritorious and distinguished service in a position of great responsibility to the Government of the United States as Chief of Staff to Commander FIFTH Fleet during the central Pacific campaign from August 1943 to September 1944. Captain Moore supervised planning for operations pointing toward capture and occupation of enemy-held positions in the Gilbert, Marshall and Marianas Islands and employed his comprehensive knowledge of combat strategy in guiding intricate details involved in executing these vital operations.
- Legion of Merit: Bureau of Naval Personnel Information Bulletin No. 350 (May 1946)
- Gold Star in lieu of a Second Award of the Silver Star for exceptionally meritorious conduct in the performance of outstanding services to the Government of the United States as Senior Naval Member, Senior Member of the Joint U.S. Strategic Committee from September 1942 to July 1943; Senior Naval Member and Senior Member of the Joint War Plans Committee, April 1943 to July 1943, and Deputy Secretary to the Joint Chief of Staff, May 1945 to October 1945.
- The Order of the British Empire: For his service in World War II
