= 2014 Arkansas Secretary of State election =

- November 4, 2014
Nominee	Mark Martin	Susan Inman
Party	Republican	Democratic
Popular vote	506,384	292,878
Percentage	60.61%	35.06%
- County results Martin: 40–50% 50–60% 60–70% 70–80% Inman: 40–50% 50–60% 60–70%
Secretary of State before election
Mark Martin
Republican
Elected Secretary of State
Mark Martin
Republican

The 2014 Arkansas Secretary of State election took place on November 4, 2014, to elect the Secretary of State of Arkansas. Incumbent Republican Mark Martin was re-elected to a second term in office, defeating Democratic challenger Susan Inman in a landslide.

== Republican primary ==
=== Candidates ===
==== Nominee ====
- Mark Martin, incumbent secretary of state (2011–2019)

== Democratic primary ==
=== Candidates ===
==== Nominee ====
- Susan Inman, Director of Elections under former Secretary of State Sharon Priest

== Libertarian primary ==
=== Candidates ===
==== Nominee ====
- Jacob Holloway

== General election ==
=== Polling ===
Poll source	Date(s) administered	Sample size	Margin of error	Mark Martin (R)	Susan Inman (D)	Jacob Holloway (L)	Undecided
Public Policy Polling	October 30–November 1, 2014	1,092	± 3%	47%	35%	6%	11%
Suffolk	September 20–23, 2014	500	± 4.4%	35%	34%	6%	25%
Public Policy Polling	September 18–21, 2014	1,453	± 2.6%	43%	32%	5%	20%
Public Policy Polling	August 1–3, 2014	1,066	± 3%	39%	33%	6%	21%

=== Results ===
2014 Arkansas Secretary of State election
Party	Candidate	Votes	%
Republican	Mark Martin (incumbent)	506,384	60.61
Democratic	Susan Inman	292,878	35.06
Libertarian	Jacob Holloway	36,159	4.33
Total votes		835,421	100.00
Republican hold			

==== By county ====
County	Mark Martin Republican		Susan Inman Democratic		Jacob Holloway Libertarian		Margin		Total
County	#	%	#	%	#	%	#	%	Total
Arkansas	2,922	58.01%	1,949	38.69%	166	3.30%	973	19.32%	5,037
Ashley	3,669	59.44%	2,354	38.13%	150	2.43%	1,315	21.30%	6,173
Baxter	10,558	71.50%	3,475	23.53%	734	4.97%	7,083	47.97%	14,767
Benton	44,396	71.70%	14,295	23.09%	3,230	5.22%	30,101	48.61%	61,921
Boone	7,773	72.16%	2,426	22.52%	573	5.32%	5,347	49.64%	10,772
Bradley	1,629	57.10%	1,148	40.24%	76	2.66%	481	16.86%	2,853
Calhoun	998	61.72%	562	34.76%	57	3.53%	436	26.96%	1,617
Carroll	4,824	60.56%	2,780	34.90%	361	4.53%	2,044	25.66%	7,965
Chicot	1,303	37.68%	2,089	60.41%	66	1.91%	-786	-22.73%	3,458
Clark	3,381	49.16%	3,272	47.58%	224	3.26%	109	1.58%	6,877
Clay	2,432	61.76%	1,336	33.93%	170	4.32%	1,096	27.83%	3,938
Cleburne	7,195	73.48%	2,198	22.45%	399	4.07%	4,997	51.03%	9,792
Cleveland	1,772	65.58%	830	30.72%	100	3.70%	942	34.86%	2,702
Columbia	4,720	62.29%	2,216	29.24%	642	8.47%	2,504	33.04%	7,578
Conway	3,538	56.21%	2,510	39.88%	246	3.91%	1,028	16.33%	6,294
Craighead	16,324	65.32%	7,401	29.62%	1,264	5.06%	8,923	35.71%	24,989
Crawford	11,515	71.87%	3,612	22.55%	894	5.58%	7,903	49.33%	16,021
Crittenden	4,952	46.91%	5,346	50.64%	258	2.44%	-394	-3.73%	10,556
Cross	3,313	63.37%	1,775	33.95%	140	2.68%	1,538	29.42%	5,228
Dallas	1,231	52.21%	1,066	45.21%	61	2.59%	165	7.00%	2,358
Desha	1,373	41.42%	1,861	56.14%	81	2.44%	-488	-14.72%	3,315
Drew	2,936	56.94%	2,071	40.17%	149	2.89%	865	16.78%	5,156
Faulkner	21,402	64.17%	10,551	31.63%	1,400	4.20%	10,851	32.53%	33,353
Franklin	3,569	65.53%	1,602	29.42%	275	5.05%	1,967	36.12%	5,446
Fulton	2,101	62.89%	1,098	32.86%	142	4.25%	1,003	30.02%	3,341
Garland	19,759	65.05%	9,411	30.98%	1,203	3.96%	10,348	34.07%	30,373
Grant	3,596	67.57%	1,483	27.87%	243	4.57%	2,113	39.70%	5,322
Greene	7,515	68.91%	2,888	26.48%	502	4.60%	4,627	42.43%	10,905
Hempstead	3,210	60.11%	2,001	37.47%	129	2.42%	1,209	22.64%	5,340
Hot Spring	5,541	59.53%	3,334	35.82%	433	4.65%	2,207	23.71%	9,308
Howard	2,124	58.38%	1,423	39.11%	91	2.50%	701	19.27%	3,638
Independence	7,299	69.47%	2,700	25.70%	507	4.83%	4,599	43.77%	10,506
Izard	2,886	66.96%	1,236	28.68%	188	4.36%	1,650	38.28%	4,310
Jackson	2,418	59.02%	1,497	36.54%	182	4.44%	921	22.48%	4,097
Jefferson	7,325	37.01%	11,986	60.56%	481	2.43%	-4,661	-23.55%	19,792
Johnson	3,900	60.01%	2,229	34.30%	370	5.69%	1,671	25.71%	6,499
Lafayette	1,390	58.63%	921	38.84%	60	2.53%	469	19.78%	2,371
Lawrence	2,897	63.56%	1,439	31.57%	222	4.87%	1,458	31.99%	4,558
Lee	1,028	39.45%	1,529	58.67%	49	1.88%	-501	-19.22%	2,606
Lincoln	1,643	53.96%	1,279	42.00%	123	4.04%	364	11.95%	3,045
Little River	2,463	61.31%	1,442	35.90%	112	2.79%	1,021	25.42%	4,017
Logan	4,155	65.00%	1,894	29.63%	343	5.37%	2,261	35.37%	6,392
Lonoke	13,952	72.01%	4,636	23.93%	787	4.06%	9,316	48.08%	19,375
Madison	3,261	64.73%	1,564	31.04%	213	4.23%	1,697	33.68%	5,038
Marion	3,450	69.39%	1,263	25.40%	259	5.21%	2,187	43.99%	4,972
Miller	7,688	67.62%	3,418	30.06%	263	2.31%	4,270	37.56%	11,369
Mississippi	5,137	51.00%	4,557	45.24%	379	3.76%	580	5.76%	10,073
Monroe	1,142	48.45%	1,163	49.34%	52	2.21%	-21	-0.89%	2,357
Montgomery	1,936	67.55%	795	27.74%	135	4.71%	1,141	39.81%	2,866
Nevada	1,468	53.83%	1,181	43.31%	78	2.86%	287	10.52%	2,727
Newton	2,038	68.37%	797	26.74%	146	4.90%	1,241	41.63%	2,981
Ouachita	4,079	53.01%	3,143	40.84%	473	6.15%	936	12.16%	7,695
Perry	2,159	61.32%	1,160	32.95%	202	5.74%	999	28.37%	3,521
Phillips	2,061	36.13%	3,414	59.85%	229	4.01%	-1,353	-23.72%	5,704
Pike	2,051	67.00%	899	29.37%	111	3.63%	1,152	37.63%	3,061
Poinsett	4,040	64.32%	1,980	31.52%	261	4.16%	2,060	32.80%	6,281
Polk	4,620	73.52%	1,362	21.67%	302	4.81%	3,258	51.85%	6,284
Pope	12,208	72.02%	3,988	23.53%	755	4.45%	8,220	48.49%	16,951
Prairie	1,622	61.49%	873	33.09%	143	5.42%	749	28.39%	2,638
Pulaski	54,103	43.10%	67,008	53.38%	4,430	3.53%	-12,905	-10.28%	125,541
Randolph	3,109	62.38%	1,621	32.52%	254	5.10%	1,488	29.86%	4,984
Saline	26,606	68.12%	10,654	27.28%	1,795	4.60%	15,952	40.84%	39,055
Scott	2,101	69.68%	754	25.01%	160	5.31%	1,347	44.68%	3,015
Searcy	2,213	73.99%	623	20.83%	155	5.18%	1,590	53.16%	2,991
Sebastian	21,376	67.93%	8,391	26.66%	1,702	5.41%	12,985	41.26%	31,469
Sevier	2,308	65.79%	1,100	31.36%	100	2.85%	1,208	34.44%	3,508
Sharp	3,860	68.48%	1,497	26.56%	280	4.97%	2,363	41.92%	5,637
St. Francis	2,427	40.74%	3,376	56.67%	154	2.59%	-949	-15.93%	5,957
Stone	2,988	67.45%	1,218	27.49%	224	5.06%	1,770	39.95%	4,430
Union	7,365	61.21%	4,001	33.25%	666	5.54%	3,364	27.96%	12,032
Van Buren	3,782	64.75%	1,760	30.13%	299	5.12%	2,022	34.62%	5,841
Washington	32,011	59.78%	18,689	34.90%	2,852	5.33%	13,322	24.88%	53,552
White	16,119	74.40%	4,624	21.34%	921	4.25%	11,495	53.06%	21,664
Woodruff	908	42.73%	1,125	52.94%	92	4.33%	-217	-10.21%	2,125
Yell	3,221	62.65%	1,729	33.63%	191	3.72%	1,492	29.02%	5,141
Totals	506,384	60.61%	292,878	35.06%	36,159	4.33%	213,506	25.56%	835,421

Counties that flipped from Democratic to Republican

- Arkansas (largest city: Stuttgart)
- Bradley (largest city: Warren)
- Calhoun (largest city: Hampton)
- Clark (largest city: Arkadelphia)
- Clay (largest city: Piggott)
- Conway (largest city: Morrilton)
- Cross (largest city: Wynne)
- Dallas (largest city: Fordyce)
- Drew (largest city: Monticello)
- Hot Spring (largest city: Malvern)
- Howard (largest city: Nashville)
- Independence (largest city: Batesville)
- Izard (largest city: Horseshoe Bend)
- Jackson (largest city: Newport)
- Johnson (largest city: Clarksville)
- Lawrence (largest city: Walnut Ridge)
- Lincoln (largest city: Star City)
- Little River (largest city: Ashdown)
- Mississippi (largest city: Blytheville)
- Nevada (largest city: Prescott)
- Ouachita (largest city: Camden)
- Pike (largest city: Glenwood)
- Poinsett (largest city: Trumann)
- Prairie (largest city: Des Arc)
- Randolph (largest city: Pocahontas)
- Van Buren (largest city: Clinton)
- Yell (largest city: Dardanelle)
