= Helen Louise Trembley =

American entomologist

- Born: July 18, 1905; Washington, D.C., U.S.
- Died: December 23, 1983 (aged 78); Concord, California, U.S.
- Other name: Helen Durkee
- Occupations: Entomologist, parasitologist

Helen Louise Trembley Durkee (July 18, 1905 – December 23. 1983) was an American medical entomologist and parasitologist, affiliated with the United States Department of Agriculture (USDA) and the National Institutes of Health (NIH). She worked on mosquito vectors of malaria in birds, and tested anti-malarial drugs.

== Biography ==
Trembley was born in Washington, D.C., the daughter of Mark McCurdy Trembley and Mary A. Hassman Trembley. She graduated from Eastern High School in 1923 and George Washington University in 1933, and earned a master's degree in 1939. She was a member of Sigma Xi and Phi Delta Gamma. In 1954, George Washington University honored her as an outstanding alumnus.

Trembley was a medical entomologist at the USDA's Bureau of Entomology and Plant Quarantine from 1939 to 1942, and at the United States Public Health Service in the NIH from 1942. She maintained mosquito colonies for experimental use. She was associate editor of Mosquito News, and a member of the American Mosquito Control Association, the American Association for the Advancement of Science (AAAS), the Entomological Society of America, the American Association of Economic Entomologists, the National Malaria Society, and the Entomological Society of Washington.

Trembley married engineer Kenneth Melvin Durkee in 1954. She retired to California in 1955, and died in 1983, at the age of 78, in Concord, California.

== Publications ==
Trembley's research was published in scholarly journals including Science, Journal of Economic Entomology, Journal of Parasitology, Experimental Biology and Medicine, and American Journal of Tropical Medicine and Hygiene.

- "Distribution and Hosts of some Fleas of Economic Importance" (1940, with Fred Corry Bishopp)
- "Derris used for the Control of Head Lice and Pubic Lice" (1943)
- "Distribution and Hosts of Certain North American Ticks" (1945, with F. C. Bishopp)
- "Laboratory Rearing of Aëdes atropalpus" (1945)
- "Aëdes atropalpus (Coq.) a New Mosquito Vector of Plasmodium gallinaceum Brumpt" (1946)
- "Biological Characteristics of Laboratory-Reared Aëdes atropalpus" (1947)
- "Use of Aerosol OT in Dissecting Salivary Glands of Mosquitoes Infected With Malaria" (1947, with Edward S. Josephson and William B. Culwell)
- "Antimalarial Activity of Aureomycin Against Plasmodium gallinaceum in the Chick" (1949, with G. Robert Coatney, W. Clark Cooper, and Joseph Greenberg)
- "Strain Differences in Plasmodium gallinaceum Brumpt" (1951, with G. Robert Coatney and Joseph Greenberg)
- "Pyloric Spines in Mosquitoes" (1951)
- "The Distribution of Certain Liquids in the Esophageal Diverticula and Stomach of Mosquitoes" (1952)
- "Deed Cleveland Thurman Jr., 1921–1953" (1953)
- "The Apparent Transfer of Pyrimethamine Resistance from the BI Strain of Plasmodium gallinaceum to the M Strain" (1954, with Joseph Greenberg)
- "Infections Produced by Mixed Strains of Plasmodium gallinaceum in Chicks" (1954, with Joseph Greenberg)
- "Further Studies on the Hybridization of Strains of Plasmodium gallinaceum" (1954, with Joseph Greenberg)
- Observations on the oxygen consumption of some adult mosquitoes (1955, with Teresa I. Mercado and Theodor von Brand)
