= Tremblay =

Tremblay (French pronunciation: [tʁɑ̃blɛ]) may refer to:

== Places ==
=== Canada ===
- Tremblay, New Brunswick
- Tremblay, Quebec, a former township municipality, now part of Saguenay
- Tremblay River, a tributary of the rivière aux Anglais in Rivière-aux-Outardes, Quebec
- Tremblay Sound, Nunavut

=== France ===
- Tremblay, Ille-et-Vilaine, Ille-et-Vilaine department
- Le Tremblay, Maine-et-Loire department
- Tremblay-en-France, Seine-Saint-Denis department
- Tremblay-les-Villages, Eure-et-Loir department
- Le Tremblay-Omonville, Eure department
- Le Tremblay-sur-Mauldre, Yvelines department
- Tremblay Park, an urban park in the commune of Champigny-sur-Marne (a part of Paris)

== Other uses ==
- Tremblay (surname)
- Tremblay v Daigle, Canadian court case over abortion
- Tremblay Commission, or Royal Commission of Inquiry on Constitutional Problems, a Quebec government report on Canada's constitution
- Tremblay station, an O-Train station in Ottawa, Ontario, Canada

== See also ==
- Trembley, a surname
