= Eleni Epstein =

American former newspaper editor (1925–1991)

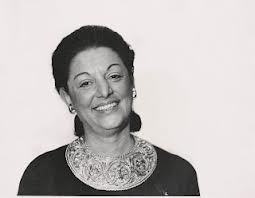
- Born: March 17, 1925; Washington, D.C., U.S.
- Died: January 28, 1991 (aged 65); Washington, D.C.
- Education: George Washington University; Columbia University
- Occupation: Fashion Editor

Eleni Sakes Epstein (March 17, 1925 – January 28, 1991) was a fashion editor for The Washington Star. Epstein helped put Washington on the international fashion map.

== Early life and education ==
Epstein was born Helen Sakes to Greek immigrant parents in Washington, D.C. on March 17, 1925. Her father ran a restaurant on Pennsylvania Ave, S.E.. She spent her formative years in Washington, D.C., graduating from Eastern High School and later attending George Washington University and Columbia University.

== Career ==
During World War II, Epstein began her journalism career at The Washington Star as a copy assistant. Shortly after she rose to the position as fashion editor, a position she held for 33 years until 1981 when the Star ceased publication. For the Star she wrote reports from the fashion capitals of Europe and Asia under the byline " Eleni". New York, London, Rome, Milan, Paris, Hong Kong and Tokyo were fashion markets she covered in her articles.

== Personal life and death ==
Epstein the fashion editor met fellow Washington journalist Sidney "Sid" Epstein when he joined the Star in 1954. The couple married in 1958 and remained married until her death.

Eleni Epstein died at her home in Washington on January 28, 1991. She suffered from scleroderma, a vascular disease.
