= Ann Tukey Harrison =

American academic (1938–2021)

- Born: April 19, 1938; Geneva, New York, USA
- Died: October 28, 2021 (aged 83); East Lansing, Michigan, USA
- Education: University of Michigan
- Occupation: Professor of French
- Employer: Michigan State University
- Notable work: The Danse Macabre of Women: Ms. Fr. 995 of the Bibliothèque Nationale

Ann Tukey Harrison (April 19, 1938 – October 28, 2021) was an American academic specializing in Romance Languages and medieval women's history.

== Early life ==
Ann Tukey was born on April 19, 1938, in Geneva, New York, to Harold and Ruth (née Schweigert) Tukey. She attended East Lansing High School, graduating in 1954 with awards including The Quill and Scroll for excellence in journalism and the National Honor Society. She received her university education from Michigan State University: the BA in French in 1957, the MA in French in 1958, and a PhD in linguistics from the University of Michigan in 1960. She was awarded a Woodrow Wilson Fellowship in 1957–1958. Her mother Ruth had a Ph.D. in educational psychology from Michigan State University and was a senior lecturer there. Her father Harold was the head of the Michigan State University department of horticulture.

She married the theoretical physicist Michael J. Harrison in 1970. The couple were active in Jewish life in Lansing, attending the Congregation Kehillat Israel from its earliest days.

== Career ==
Ann Tukey Harrison was professor of French at Michigan State University from 1965 until she became professor emerita in 1999. She also worked at the University of Wisconsin-Madison as an instructor from 1961 to 1965 and was the Ruth Dean Lecturer at Mount Holyoke College in 1976. She was also the vice-president of the American Association of Teachers of French from 1985 to 1990.

Tukey Harrison specialized in fifteenth century women's history, publishing a book called Charles d’Orleans and the Allegorical Mode in 1975. The book explores whether Charles d'Orleans can be described as an allegorist. A reviewer wrote that the book had "cogent analyses, backed by appropriate textual references, it constitutes a welcome addition to Orleans criticism."

In 1994, she published an English edition of The Danse Macabre of Women: Ms. Fr. 995 of the Bibliothèque Nationale. This fifteenth-century, anonymously authored French poem describes 36 women of all ages in dialogue with Death. This poem is part of the Danse Macabre motif, frequently explored in the Late Middle Ages. Tukey Harrison's edition reproduces the original illuminated manuscript found in the Bibliothèque Nationale . A digital scan of the original manuscript can be found in the Bibliotheque Nationale's online archive (Français 995, La Danse macabre des femmes). In her review of the book, published in the periodical Women's Art Journal, Laura Rinaldi Defresne wrote that Tukey's work was 'elegant' and 'meticulously researched'. Other reviewers noted that the text was 'solid' and 'accessible to students.'

== Death ==
Ann Tukey Harrison died on October 28, 2021, in East Lansing, Michigan.

== Publications ==
=== Books ===
- Harrison, Ann Tukey, et al., editors. The Danse Macabre of Women: Ms. Fr. 995 of the Bibliothèque Nationale. The Kent State University Press, 1994.
- Harrison, Ann T. Charles d’Orleans and the Allegorical Mode. University of North Carolina Department of Romance Languages, 1975.

=== Articles ===
- Harrison, Ann Tukey (1971). Charles d’Orléans and the Renaissance. The Bulletin of the Rocky Mountain Modern Language Association, 25(3), 86–92. https://doi.org/10.2307/1346682
- Harrison, Ann Tukey (1980). The Theme of Authority in the Works of Francois Villon. The Centennial Review, 24(1), 65–78. JSTOR 23740373
- Harrison, Ann Tukey (1981). Aude and Bramimunde: Their Importance in the Chanson de Roland. The French Review, 54(5), 672–679. JSTOR 391206
- Harrison, Ann Tukey (1982). Echo and Her Medieval Sisters. The Centennial Review, 26(4), 324–340. JSTOR 23739427
- Harrison, Ann Tukey (1989). Fifteenth-Century French Women's Role Names. The French Review, 62(3), 436–444. JSTOR 39545
