= Tyrone Brunson (musician) =

American musician (1956–2013)

- Also known as: Ty Brunson, Tystick
- Born: Calvin Tyrone Brunson; March 22, 1956; Washington, D.C., U.S.
- Died: May 25, 2013 (aged 57) Washington, D.C., U.S.
- Genres: R&B, electro, funk, soul
- Occupation(s): Singer, musician
- Instrument(s): Bass, keyboards, vocals
- Years active: 1970s–1993
- Labels: Believe in a Dream, MCA
- Formerly of: The Family, Osiris

Tyrone Brunson (born Calvin Tyrone Brunson; March 22, 1956 – May 25, 2013) was an American singer and musician, who played the bass guitar. One of his most successful singles was an electro-funk instrumental titled "The Smurf" (1982), which reached #14 on the Billboard R&B chart in 1983 and led to further dance records about The Smurfs.

== Life and career ==
Calvin Tyrone Brunson was born in Washington, D.C. In his early career, he played in several local groups. He was the leader of the mid-1970s funk band The Family. Later, he was the bassist for the late-1970s funk band Osiris. His first single, "The Smurf", released in the UK on the Mercury Records label, entered the UK singles chart on December 25, 1982, and reached #52; it remained in the chart for 5 weeks. "The Smurf" appeared on Brunson's debut studio album, Sticky Situation. In 1983, the follow-up U.S. single, the album's title track, reached #25 on the R&B chart.

In 1984, Brunson released his second studio album, Fresh. While the title track reached #22 on the R&B chart, no other singles made a significant dent on the chart. In 1987, Brunson released his third studio album, Love Triangle, but with no successful singles, the album fizzled on the charts. Later on, Brunson was a backing vocalist, most notably for the R&B/pop trio Levert.

After leaving the music business in the 1990s, he became an IT instructor.

Tyrone Brunson died on May 25, 2013, in Washington, D.C., at the age of 57.

== Discography ==
=== Albums ===
Year	Album	Chart positions
Year	Album	US R&B
1983	Sticky Situation	25
1984	Fresh	—
1986	The Method	—
1987	Love Triangle	—
"—" denotes releases that did not chart.

=== Singles ===
Year	Single	Peak chart positions		
Year	Single	US R&B	US Dance	UK
1982	"Sticky Situation"	25	—	—
1982	"The Smurf" b/w "I Need Love"	14	35	52
1983	"Hot Line"	70	—	—
1984	"Fresh"	22	—	—
1984	"Don't You Want It" b/w "In Love with You"	—	—	—
1986	"The Method"	—	—	—
1987	"Love Triangle" (featuring Gayle Adams) b/w "Free Bee"	—	—	—
1988	"Say Yeah"	—	—	—
1988	"The Big Payback" (featuring Desi Dez)	—	—	—
1993	"All of Me" (featuring Chanelle)	—	33	—
"—" denotes releases that did not chart or were not released in that territory.
