= Jane Schutt =

American civil rights activist

- Born: January 2, 1913; Washington, D.C.
- Died: July 23, 2006 (aged 93); Severna Park
- Alma mater: George Washington University
- Occupation: Activist

Jane Page Menefee Schutt (January 2, 1913 – July 23, 2006) was an American civil rights activist in Jackson, Mississippi during the American civil rights movement.

== Early life and education ==
Jane Schutt was born on January 2, 1913 in Washington, D.C., the daughter of Randolph and Gertrude Menefee. She was valedictorian at Langley Junior High School in 1927 and graduated from Eastern High School in 1929. She attended George Washington University from 1929 to 1932. There she met Wallis I. Schutt, an engineering student, and they married in 1934. They had five children and moved around the country for his engineering work. They settled in Jackson, Mississippi in 1942 at 955 Pecan Blvd.

== Civil rights ==
A devout Episcopalian, Schutt became active at St. Columb's Episcopal Church in Jackson. She was also active in the Mississippi branch of United Council of Church Women, a Protestant social justice organization, serving as president of the branch from 1959 to 1961. Her work with that organization brought her to the attention of the United States Commission on Civil Rights, which was forming a Mississippi State Advisory Committee. Joining in December 1959, she was the only white woman on the racially mixed committee. She became chair in 1962 and testified before the US Senate in May 1963. She told them:

How else and in what other way can we begin to dispel the abysmal ignorance of the great majority of our responsible white citizens as regards what the Negro citizen lives through daily and really wants, expects, and is determined to gain for himself? And until this ignorance is dispelled, how, under the shining sun are we to avoid these tragic and heartbreaking disturbances that continue to plague us or even having experienced them, how are we to learn from them and move forward together unless we have somebody set up to render the assistance and give the answers to the many questions that must be asked before the truly constructive steps that issue out of understanding can be made to rectify the situation.

Immediately on joining the committee, Schutt and her family became the targets of daily harassment and intimidation, were denounced by politicians, and even subjected to terrorist violence. A stick of dynamite was thrown at the family home, destroying the front windows. Shortly before Christmas 1963, a cross was burnt on their front lawn. In defiance of the Ku Klux Klan, she strung the burnt remains of the cross with lights and incorporated it into a nativity scene.

The Mississippi State Sovereignty Commission concluded that "Mrs. Schutt is the real source of trouble on the committee" and worked covertly to exert pressure on her through her church and her husband's employer, the M. T. Reed Construction Company. They succeeded in forcing her to resign from the Committee in 1963. She worked for civil rights in other ways, using her home to host Freedom Riders of 1961 and voting registration workers during Freedom Summer of 1964, and working with Wednesdays in Mississippi to bring both black and white clubwomen to fight for civil rights in Mississippi. Other causes she worked for over the years include the Arc of Mississippi, Head Start, and the Girl Scouts.

== Awards and honors ==
Jane Schutt was awarded the Robert F. Kennedy and Martin Luther King Jr. Award by the Mississippi Council on Human Relations in 1973, the Mississippi Religious Leadership Conference Award in 1978, and the Church Women United’s Valiant Woman Award in 1979.

== Death and legacy ==
Her home at 955 Pecan Blvd. is a stop on the City of Jackson Civil Rights Tour.

Jane Schutt died on July 23, 2006, at the home of her daughter in Severna Park, Maryland.
