= Quill and Scroll =

International high school journalism honor society

- Founded: April 10, 1926; 99 years ago University of Iowa
- Type: Honor
- Affiliation: National Scholastic Press Association
- Status: Active
- Emphasis: High School Journalism
- Scope: International
- Motto: "Ye shall know the truth and the truth shall make ye free."
- Pillars: Truth, Initiative, Learning, Integrity, Leadership, Judgement, Loyalty, Friendship
- Colors: Blue and Gold
- Publication: The Weekly Scroll
- Chapters: 14,611
- Members: 5,235 (2022-23) active 1,500,000+ lifetime
- Headquarters: 7300 Metro Boulevard, Suite 131; Minneapolis, Minnesota 55439; United States
- Website: quillandscroll.org

Quill and Scroll is an international high school journalism honor society that recognizes and encourages both individual and group achievements in scholastic journalism. The organization was founded in 1926 at the University of Iowa. In 2022, it merged with the National Scholastic Press Association. Chapters are located in 14,611 high schools in 38 countries.

== History ==
George Gallup and a group of high school advisors founded Quill and Scroll honor society high school journalism on April 10, 1926, at the University of Iowa. Its purpose was to recognize ability and achievement in writing by high school journalists, encourage interest in scholastic journalism, promote professional standards and a code of ethics, and to encourage "exact and dispassionate and clear and forceful writing". Gallup, a noted pollster and professor at the university, served as Quill and Scroll's first national secretary. Elizabeth White Parks, a journalism teacher at Central High School in Omaha, Nebraska, was the society's first president.

The society was launched with nineteen founding chapters, all chartered on April 10, 1926, including:

- Abraham Lincoln High School – Council Bluffs, Iowa
- Abraham Lincoln High School – Des Moines, Iowa
- Albert Lea High School – Albert Lea, Minnesota
- Austin High School – Austin, Minnesota
- Benton High School – St. Joseph, Missouri
- Burlington High School – Burlington, Iowa
- Central High School – Omaha, Nebraska
- Cheyenne Central High School – Cheyenne, Wyoming
- Dubuque Senior High School – Dubuque, Iowa
- Fort Dodge High School – Fort Dodge, Iowa
- George Washington High School – Cedar Rapids, Iowa
- Great Falls High School – Great Falls, Montana
- Iowa City High School – Iowa City, Iowa
- Lincoln High School – Lincoln, Nebraska
- Mitchell High School – Mitchell, South Dakota
- Riverside High School – Milwaukee, Wisconsin
- South High School – Omaha, Nebraska
- South Side High School – Fort Wayne, Indiana
- Watertown High School – Watertown, South Dakota

Quill and Scroll rapidly expanded in the United States. Members were initiated at the Freeport High School in Freeport, Illinois in May 1926. The Josephus Daniels chapter was established at Hugh Morson High School in Raleigh, North Carolina on July 7, 1926. A chapter was also established on December 4, 1926 at the Holland High School in Holland, Michigan, followed by Knoxville High School in Knoxville, Tennessee in late December 1926.

In 1927, Quill and Scroll sponsored a national writing competition to encourage high school students' interest in journalism. In May 1931, the society had 12,000 active members and 586 chapters. By September 1934, it had more than 800 chapters, located in every state in the U.S., along with Alaska, British Honduras, China, England, and Hawaii. In 1937, Quill and Scroll Corporation incorporated as a nonprofit organization. It established the Quill and Scroll Foundation in 1940, which provides scholarships.

In 2022, Quill and Scroll merged with the National Scholastic Press Association. As of 2025, Quill and Scroll has more than 1,500,000 members and has established more than 15,000 chapters in add fifty U.S. states and 37 countries. To be eligible for a charter, a high school must publish a magazine, newspaper, yearbook, literary magazine, broadcast program, or website; or, the school must have students who are under the supervision of a local news bureau, radio or television station, or publication. Its national headquarters is located in Minneapolis, Minnesota.

== Symbols ==
The motto of Quill and Scroll is "Ye shall know the truth and the truth shall make ye free." Quill and Scroll's guiding principles or pillars are Truth, Initiative, Learning, Integrity, Leadership, Judgement, Loyalty, and Friendship.

Initiates received a gold pen shaped like a scroll, with a quill over the scroll. Members may also wear and blue and gold honor cord at graduation.

== Activities ==
Quill and Scroll sponsors various contents, including a Yearbook Excellence Contest and an International Writing, Visual, Multimedia Contest. It also presents the Gallup Award for news media evaluation. Quill and Scroll has no requirements for local chapters' activities but encourages chapters to pursue activities that serve its school's journalism and publications program.

Historically, the society published Quill & Scroll Magazine four times during the school year; the society now published The Weekly Scroll online.

== Membership ==
Quill and Scroll has three membership types: active (student), faculty, and honorary. To be eligible for induction into Quill and Scroll, students must meet the following five requirements:

- They must be junior or senior. Second-semester sophomores may be initiated during the last grading period of their sophomore year. Their membership will become effective at the beginning of their junior year.
- They must be in the upper third of their class in general scholastic standing, either for the year of their election or for the cumulative total of all high school work.
- They must have done superior work in some phase of journalism or school publications work. They may be staffers of a magazine, newspaper, yearbook, news bureau, or radio/television station.
- They must be recommended by the supervisor or by the committee governing publications.
- The society's executive director must approve them.

When a charter is granted, the publication's adviser or advisers automatically become a faculty member.

== Notable members ==
- Sarah Agee, Arkansas House of Representatives
- Regis Louise Boyle, educator and president of Quill and Scroll
- Mary Ellen Edmunds, The Church of Jesus Christ of Latter-day Saints missionary and public speaker
- Ann Tukey Harrison, professor of French at Michigan State University
- Wilma Scott Heide, feminine activist and president of National Organization for Women
- Cathy Jamison, competition swimmer in the 1968 Summer Olympics
- Carolyn Kreiter-Foronda, Poet Laureate of Virginia
- Rosemarie Skaine, sociologist and author
