= Kevin LeVar =

- Birth name: Kevin LeVar Gray
- Born: Washington D.C.
- Genres: Gospel, praise & worship, urban contemporary gospel
- Occupation(s): Singer, songwriter
- Instrument(s): vocals, singer-songwriter
- Years active: 2008–present
- Labels: One Sound Entertainment
- Website: kevinlevar.com

Kevin LeVar is an American musician from the Washington metropolitan area.

Within the music industry, Kevin founded independent gospel label God Glorified Music, Inc. (recently renamed One Sound Entertainment) and partnered with Universal Music Christian Group for the national release of Kevin's debut project "Let's Come Together." This album experienced much commercial success. Both singles, "You Are Not Alone" (written to encourage families impacted by the VA Tech shootings) and "A Heart That Forgives" peaked at No. 1 on Gospel Music Channel. The "Let's Come Together (Deluxe Edition)" ranked as No. 3 Top Gospel CD in Jet Magazine and YouTube views for tracks from the Let's Come Together project exceed 5 million and counting.

Kevin's sophomore project, "Destiny! Live at The Dream Center" (released by Central South Distribution) was recorded at Angelus Temple, home of the Los Angeles Dream Center, led by Pastor Matthew Barnett. Of the thousands in attendance, the special guests of the night included over 500 of the community's recovering addicts, homeless, and rescued victims of human trafficking who were bused in for the live recording. The album's focus reminds listeners that like the story of Joseph, your future, and ultimate destiny is much greater than the tests and trials it took to get there. "Your Destiny," the project's first single, spent 28 weeks on Billboard peaking at No. 7 on the Hot Gospel Songs chart and was performed by Kevin on BET/Centric's "Single Ladies" Season 4 Premiere episode (Executive Produced by Queen Latifah).

== Early life ==
Kevin LeVar Gray was born in Washington D.C., the son of Pastor Joseph, also a policeman, and Dorothy Gray, where they lead God Glorified Church of God in Christ in Silver Spring, Maryland. He graduated from Eastern High School in 1995.

== Music career ==
His music recording career got started in 2008, with the release of Let's Come Together, and it was released by Habakkuk Records on September 16, 2008. The album charted on the Billboard magazine Gospel Albums chart, where it peaked at No. 22. He released, Destiny, on August 12, 2014, with God Glorified Music. This album charted on the aforementioned chart at No. 21.

== Personal life ==
LeVar married his long-time tour manager, Shondale Bostick, on December 17, 2010.

== Discography ==
List of albums, with selected chart positions
Title	Album details	Peak chart positions
Title	Album details	US Gos
Let's Come Together	Released: September 16, 2008; Label: Habakkuk; CD, digital download	22
Destiny	Released: August 12, 2014; Label: God Glorified; CD, digital download	21
