= Regis Louise Boyle =

American educator (1912–2007)

- Born: April 11, 1912; Washington, D.C., U.S.
- Died: September 24, 2007 (age 95); Bethesda, Maryland, U.S.
- Occupation: Educator

Regis Louise Boyle (April 11, 1912 – September 24, 2007) was an American educator, best known for teaching journalism classes and advising student publications at the secondary level.

== Early life and education ==
Boyle was born in Washington, D.C., the daughter of Charles Weems Boyle and Elma E. Payne Boyle. Her father was a lawyer who worked for the USDA. She graduated from Trinity College in 1933. She earned a master's degree and completed doctoral studies in literature at Catholic University of America. Her 1934 master's thesis was about Walt Whitman's Leaves of Grass, and her dissertation was about the novels of E. D. E. N. Southworth.

== Career ==
=== Teaching ===
Although she never had a paid job as a reporter or newspaper editor, Boyle taught journalism classes for many years, and advised student publications at high schools and colleges, including at Eastern High School from 1942 to 1955, Woodrow Wilson High School, and Walt Whitman High School. Starting in 1947, she was founder and director of an annual summer Journalism Institute for high schoolers, held at Catholic University. She also taught journalism and yearbook courses at the University of Maryland. In 1974, she was described as "one of the country's leading authorities on high school journalism."

=== Leadership ===
In 1944, Boyle was elected president of the Quill and Scroll, an international honor society for school journalists. She was president of the Educational Association of Washington, served on the executive board of the Maryland Scholastic Press Association, and was vice-president of the National Association of Journalism Directors. She was elected national president of the Trinity College Alumnae Association in 1955. Boyle was also active in Catholic charities, as president of the National Christ Child Society, and as a dame of the Sovereign Military Order of Malta. Boyle was an officer in the District of Columbia chapter of the International Federation of Catholic Alumnae.

=== Honors ===
In 1964, Boyle was recognized as an outstanding alumna of Catholic University. In 1970, she was one of the first recipients of the NSPA Pioneer Award, given by the National Scholastic Press Association to journalism educators. In 1988, a former student made a $10,000 donation to the University of Maryland's journalism program, in her honor.

== Publications ==
- "Bibliography of Teacher Education: English, 1930-40" (1941)
- "Devising a Journalism Curriculum" (1947)
- "Equipment Helpful, Cost Negligible" (1951)
- "Student Publications" (1952)

== Personal life ==
Boyle had a longtime partner, Joseph Roney, who died in 1974. His three children were described as her survivors when she died in 2007, at the age of 95, in Bethesda, Maryland.
