= George D. Beveridge =

American journalist ( 1922–1987)

George Beveridge
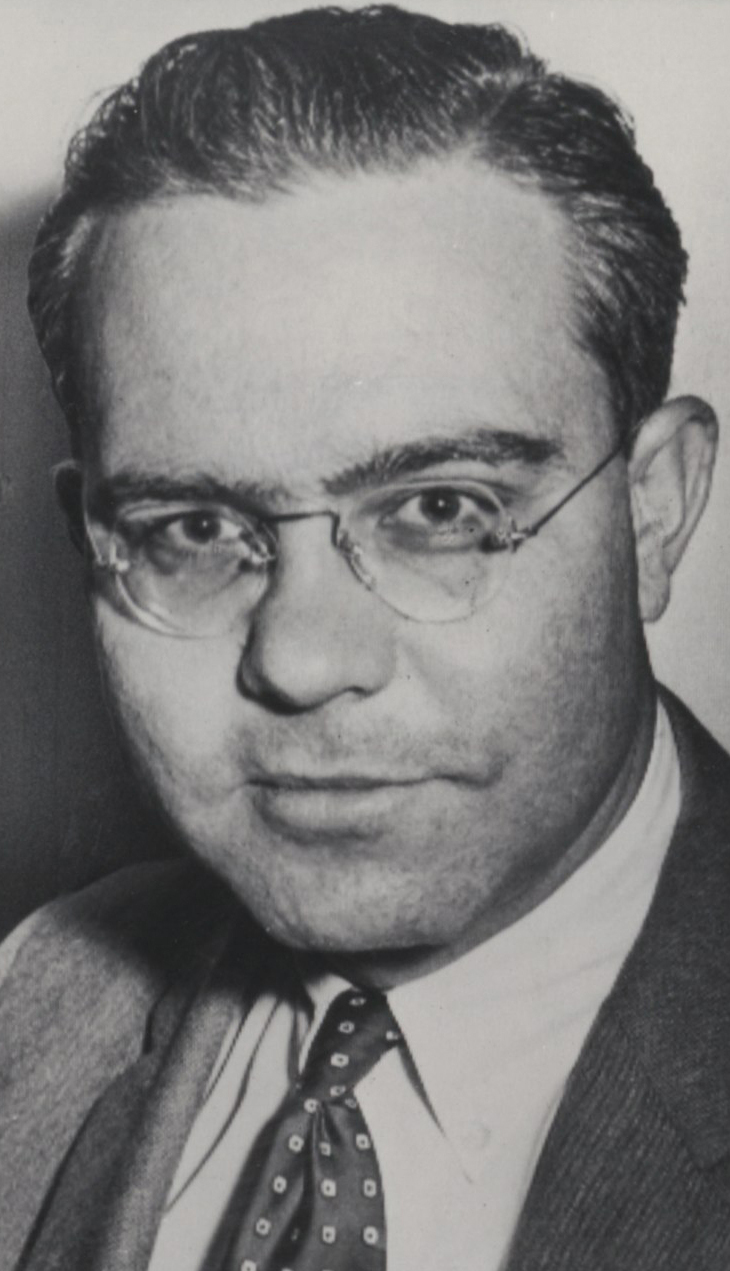
- George Beveridge Washington Evening Star 1958
- Born: January 5, 1922; Washington, D.C., US
- Died: February 14, 1987 (aged 65); Bethesda, Maryland, US
- Resting place: Arlington National Cemetery
- Occupation: Journalist
- Employer: Washington Star

George D. Beveridge (January 5, 1922 – February 14, 1987) was an American journalist praised for his coverage of the Washington politics, government, and regional development, and described by The Washington Post as "an expert on this city and a keen observer and critic of journalistic ethics and practices". He won a Pulitzer Prize for 1957 coverage of Washington urban problems.

== Youth ==
Born in Washington, D.C., Beveridge's father worked as a machinist for the federal government during the Great Depression. Although he lived briefly in Arlington, VA and raised his family in Bethesda, MD, he regarded himself a lifelong resident of the District, where he graduated from Eastern High School.

== Early career ==
After graduating from high school, Beveridge began his journalism career as a copyboy at the city's Evening Star. He enlisted in the US Army in 1942, where he wrote press releases before returning to the Star for what became a 41-year career there as reporter, editor, editorial writer, and ombudsman. He won the paper's first Pulitzer Prize for written journalism in 1958.

== Evening Star, Washington Star ==
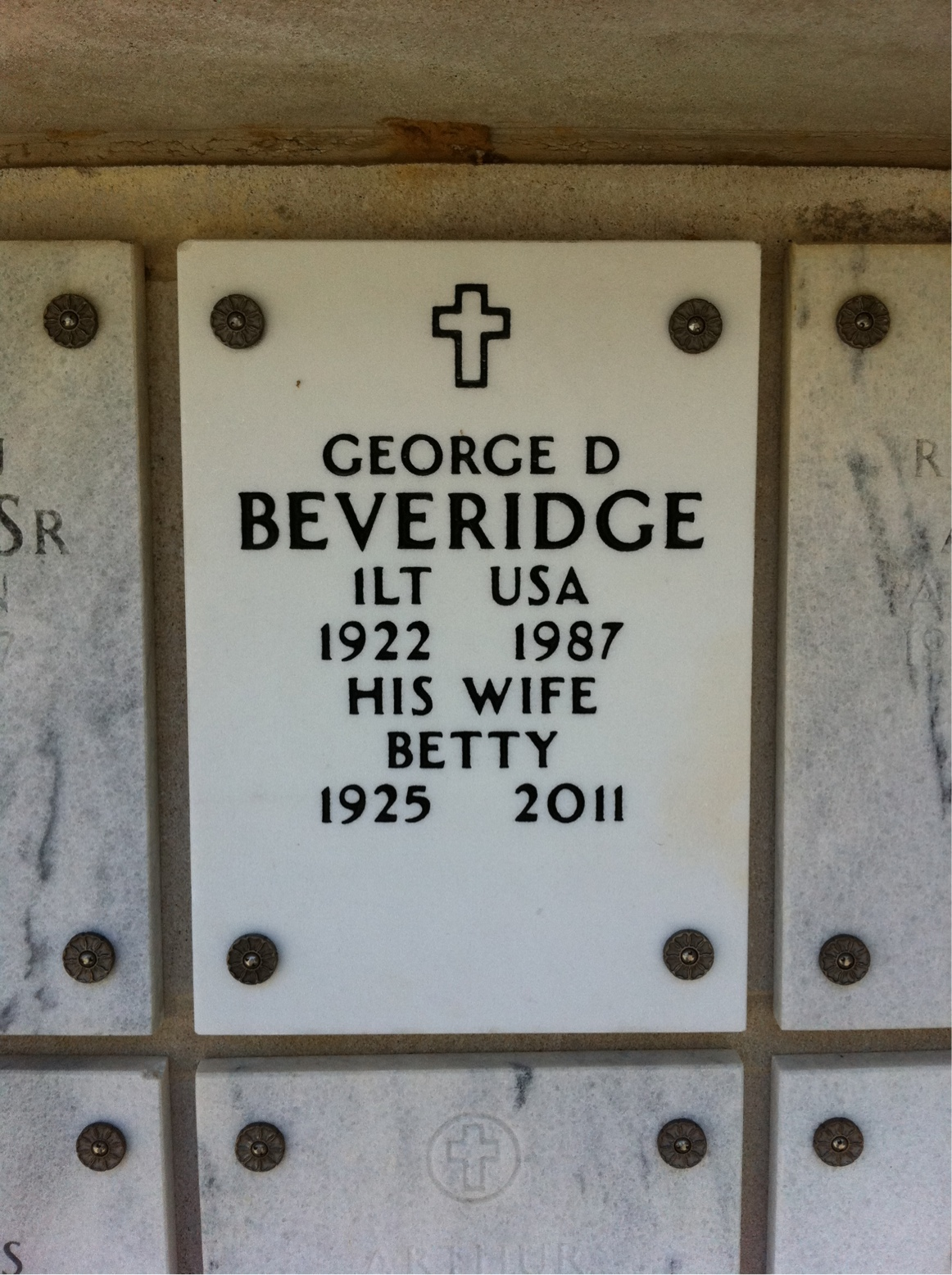
Grave at Arlington National Cemetery

Beveridge joined the Evening Star in 1940 as a copyboy while attending George Washington University in the city. He worked his way up the ladder from general assignment reporter to local and then national news reporter.

In 1958, Beveridge wrote a series of articles about urban growth and development in Washington and its Maryland and Northern Virginia suburbs (much of the current Washington metropolitan area), delineating the concept of those municipalities acting together as a region. The series, titled "Metro, City of Tomorrow" earned him a Pulitzer Prize for Local Reporting, No Edition Time (a predecessor of the Investigative Reporting Prize). The jury called the series "excellent and thought-provoking ... describing in depth the urban problems of Washington, D.C., which stimulated widespread public consideration of these problems and encouraged further studies by both public and private agencies.

In 1963, he began an 11-year stint as the Star's chief editorial writer on local affairs. After returning to the newsroom as assistant managing editor for local news, he became the Star's first ombudsman. When the paper folded in 1981, Beveridge co-wrote the lead story for its last edition.

George Beveridge died of leukemia at his home in Bethesda on February 14, 1987, aged 65.
