= Eugene Scott (journalist) =

American journalist

- Born: Washington, D.C., U.S.
- Education: University of North Carolina at Chapel Hill (BA); Harvard University (MPA)
- Occupation(s): Reporter for The Fix, a daily political blog of The Washington Post

Eugene Scott is an American journalist born in and based in Washington, D.C. He wrote for The Fix, the daily political blog of The Washington Post. Scott has won multiple awards and fellowships for his work related to covering politics, business and education.

== Early life and education ==
He was born and raised in Washington D.C., and grew up on the Hill in a political family. He graduated from Eastern High School and later went to school in North Carolina and Massachusetts and has worked in Kansas City, Phoenix and South Africa.

Scott graduated from the University of North Carolina at Chapel Hill with a bachelor's degree in journalism. He also attended the Harvard Kennedy School, where he earned his Master in Public Administration.

== Career ==
Eugene Scott's political journalism career began in the 1990s when he participated in a scholarship program founded by former Washington Post publisher Donald E. Graham. Scott joined The Washington Post's, The Fix in September 2017 to write about identity politics. He was a fellow at the Georgetown Institute of Politics and Public Service. Prior to joining the Post, he was a reporter at CNN covering politics, where he reported the 2016 presidential election and was the senior reporter on the website's team. Scott regularly provides on-air analysis for MSNBC, NPR, and CBS. While he was at CNN, he participated in a series called "The First Time I Realized I Was Black", which sparked more public discourse on skin color impacting how a person is treated.

Scott was also a researcher at Time magazine and reporter for The Charlotte Observer, The Arizona Republic, and for the Cape Argus in Cape Town, South Africa. Scott is a member of the National Association of Black Journalists.
