= Sumner Ely Wetmore Kittelle =

American naval officer (1867–1950)

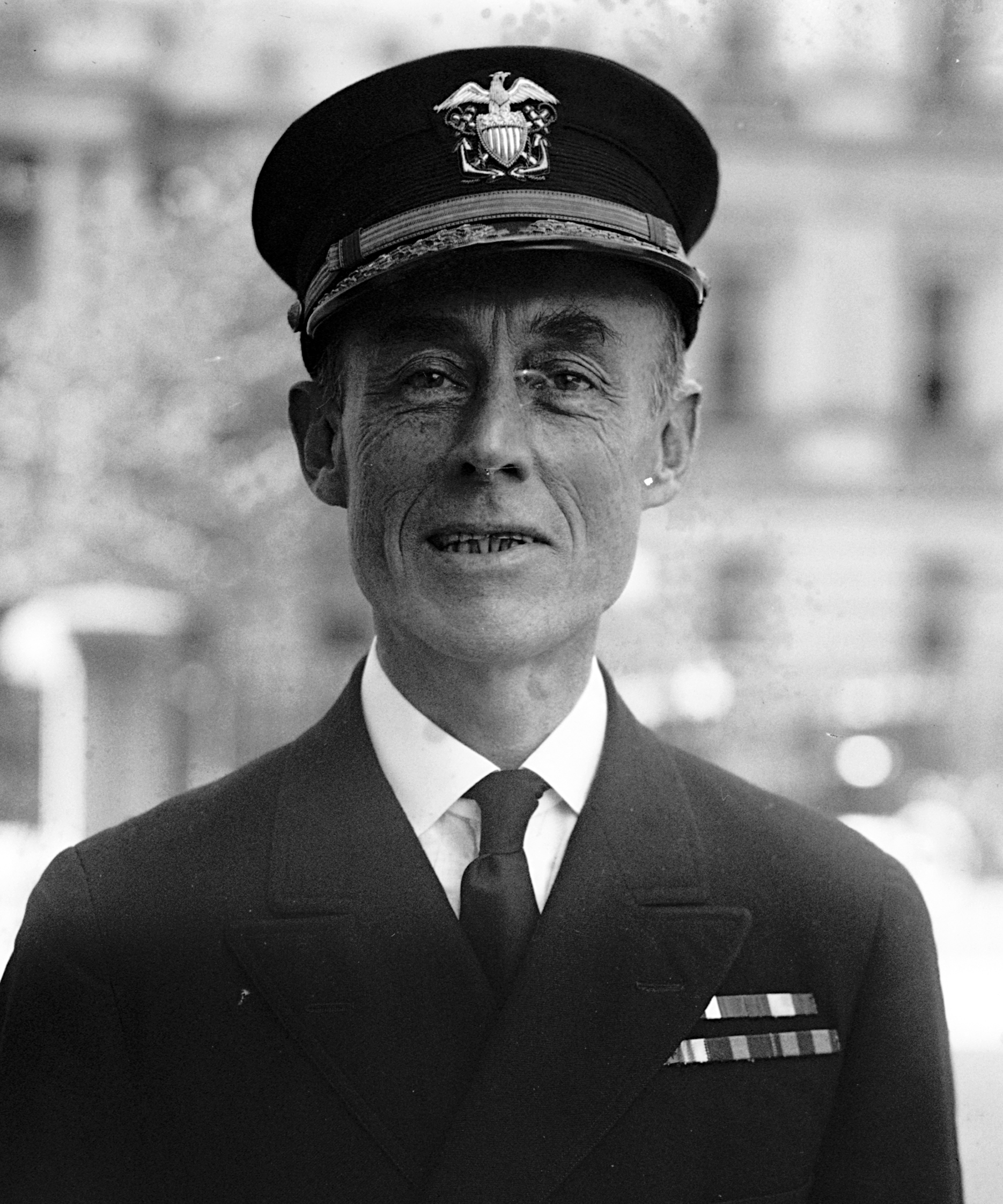
- Born: June 14, 1867; Peekskill, New York, U.S.
- Died: December 29, 1950 (aged 83)
- Spouse(s): Anna Lockwood; Elizabeth R. Delaney
- Children: 10
- Relatives: BG Lester A. Dessez, (son-in-law); RADM Charles J. Moore, (son-in-law)
- Military career
- Allegiance: United States
- Branch: United States Navy
- Service years: 1889–1931
- Rank: Rear Admiral
- Commands: USS Georgia
- Conflicts: Spanish–American War; World War I
- Awards: Navy Cross

Sumner Ely Wetmore Kittelle (June 14, 1867 – December 29, 1950) was an American naval officer who retired as a rear admiral in the United States Navy and served as the governor of the United States Virgin Islands from 1921 to 1922. He was a veteran of the Spanish–American War and World War I.

== Early life ==
Sumner Ely Wetmore Kittelle was born in Peekskill, New York, on June 14, 1867, to George Wetmore Kittelle and Marie Louise Greer. He was baptized under the name Sumner Ely and later petitioned a court to add Wetmore to his name. His maternal ancestors came to the United States from Denmark in 1751.

U.S. Representative Abram Hewitt gave Kittelle an appointment to the United States Naval Academy, which he graduated from in 1889. Prior to his appointment by Hewitt, Kittelle's mother had submitted him to the Columbia School of Mines . He studied at the Naval War College from 1914 to 1917.

== Career ==
During the Spanish–American War Kittelle was a lieutenant junior grade and participated in the Battle of Guantánamo Bay. He was promoted to captain on September 7, 1915, and rear admiral on June 3, 1921. After the outbreak of the Mexican Revolution Kittelle was placed in command of the Marietta and then Wheeling in the Gulf of Mexico.

When the United States entered World War I Kittelle ordered the seizure of all German boats in the port of Boston. His ship, Georgia, was under the command of Henry T. Mayo as part of the Third Division of the United States Fleet during World War I. Kittelle escorted ships transporting American soldiers to France and was in the middle of the Atlatnic when the armistice was issued. The Navy Cross was awarded to him for his service in World War I.

President Warren G. Harding nominated Kittelle to succeed Joseph Wallace Oman as governor of the United States Virgin Islands. He served as governor for two years. Kittelle told Harding that in regards to the U.S. Virgin Islands that "above all the white element must remain in the lead and in supreme control."

In 1929, Kittelle became president of the Board of Inspection and Survey and served until June 6, 1931, when George C. Day succeeded him. He retired from the military on July 1, 1931, due to his age.

== Personal life ==
Anna Lockwood, the daughter of Charles Dwight Sigsbee, married Kittelle on March 22, 1897, and the couple had six children before her death on May 9, 1942. He married Elizabeth Clift Rodenbaugh on July 7, 1943. He died in Washington, D.C. on December 29, 1950.

== Works cited ==
=== Books ===
- Go, Julian (2011). Patterns of Empire: The British and American Empires, 1688 to the Present. Cambridge University Press. ISBN 9781107011830.
- Kittelle, Sumner (1946). The Ketel Family Also (Ketele, Kettele, Kettel, Kittelle and Kittle).

=== News ===
- "Admiral Gives Up Post". Washington Evening Star. June 6, 1931. p. 16 – via Newspapers.com.
- "From Washington". Alexandria Gazette. March 11, 1897. p. 2 – via Newspapers.com.
- "Kittelle To Rule On Virgin Islands". Washington Times-Herald. April 15, 1921. p. 4 – via Newspapers.com.
- "Mr. Kittell Married - The Cards". The Charlotte Observer. March 24, 1897. p. 4 – via Newspapers.com.
- "Sumner E. Kittelle". The Standard-Star. December 30, 1950. p. 2 – via Newspapers.com.
- "To Perpetuate the Family Name". Washington Times-Herald. May 7, 1895. p. 6 – via Newspapers.com.

== Succession ==
Preceded by Joseph Wallace Oman	Governor of the U.S. Virgin Islands; 1921–1922	Succeeded by Henry Hughes Hough
