= Sarah Agee =

American politician (born 1946)

Member of the Arkansas House of Representatives from the 87th district
- In office January 13, 2003 – January 10, 2005
- Preceded by: Paul Bookout
- Succeeded by: Mark Martin

Member of the Arkansas House of Representatives from the 9th district
- In office January 11, 1999 – January 13, 2003
- Preceded by: Jerry Hunton
- Succeeded by: Johnnie Bolin

Personal details
- Born: January 2, 1946 (age 80) Fayetteville, Arkansas
- Party: Republican

Sarah Edith Sonneman Agee (born January 2, 1946) is an American politician who served in the Arkansas House of Representatives from 1999 to 2005.

== Early life ==
Agee was born Sarah Edith Sonneman on January 2, 1946, in Fayetteville, Arkansas. Her mother, Gladys Margaret Gosnell Sonneman, was an organist at the First Baptist Church and for the silent movies which were shown at the UARK Theater and Palace Theater, as well as working as a field representative for the Arkansas Welfare Department. Her father, Emil Herman Sonneman, was the owner and operator of the Fayetteville Country Club and Razorback Golf Course. She was from a prominent local family, with her mother’s family owning the only bookstore in Springdale and her father’s family having built seven movie theaters, the UARK Bowl, and an apartment building.

She attended local public schools, including Fayetteville High School. Growing up, Agee was involved in Girl Scout Troop 43 and regularly attended the Baptist church. In high school, she was a member of Quill and Scroll and the Choralettes, was a maid at the Colors Day Court and worked at the Campus Grill owned by her family. She graduated with honors in 1964 and enrolled at the University of Arkansas in Fayetteville. She planned to major in accounting but dropped out in her sophomore year to marry Keith Schultz, with whom she had two children. After their wedding, he joined the U.S. Navy, stationed first at Pearl Harbor and then leaving Agee in Honolulu while he served in the Vietnam War. She married Charles Agee after her divorce and the couple moved to Prairie Grove, Arkansas, where they ran the Agee Limousin Cattle farm. They had two children and Agee soon became involved with the Parent-Teacher Association (PTA) before being elected to the Prairie Grove School Board, where she would serve for nearly twelve years. She was also a member of the local police committee.

== Political career ==
In 1998, a number of seats became available in the Arkansas House of Representatives due to the 1992 term limits law. Agee was encouraged by her husband to run for office in the open 9th district seat. She ran as a Republican against Democrat Jack Norton, even though a Republican had never held the seat. Agee was elected with 56 percent of the vote. She was appointed to the city, county and local committee, the public transportation committee, and the joint performance review committee. She ran for re-election in 2000 against Ann Harbison, the Democratic Party chair for Washington County. Agee won with 63 percent of the vote. She was a member of the state agencies and government affairs committee, the revenue and taxation committee, the rules committee and the Arkansas Legislative Council. She was an elector for George W. Bush in the 2000 presidential election.

Agee was appointed by Governor Mike Huckabee as deputy floor leader of the House of Representatives in the 2001–2002 session. She worked with the Arkansas State Police, sponsoring a series of bills to amend traffic laws after initiating a study on the state traffic laws by the Interim Committees on Transportation. Following the 2000 census, the Arkansas House was redistricted and Agee ran unopposed as a candidate for District 87. She served as chair of the state agencies and governmental affairs committee and a member of the house judiciary committee and the joint budget committee. She was the co-sponsor of Act 269 of 2003, along with Senator Sue Madison, which created early voting hours for all primary, runoff and general elections.

She was termed out of running for re-election in 2004 and instead she contested District 7 of the Arkansas Senate, losing to Madison with only 48 percent of the vote. In the same year, she was appointed to the boars of directors of the Federal Home Loan Bank in Dallas, Texas. In 2005, Huckabee hired her as a legislative liaison and as an assistant for city, county and local affairs. She served as his policy advisor on agricultural issues the following year. She was appointed by the Secretary of State, Charlie Daniels, to a committee in 2006 reviewing and recommending improvements for the state’s election software. When Governor Mike Beebe was elected in 2006, he kept her on as a legislative liaison and as his liaison with the Arkansas Science and Technology Authority. From 2007 to 2014, she worked as his liaison to the Arkansas Workforce Investment Board, remaining with Beebe throughout both his terms as governor.
