= Maude E. Aiton =

American educator

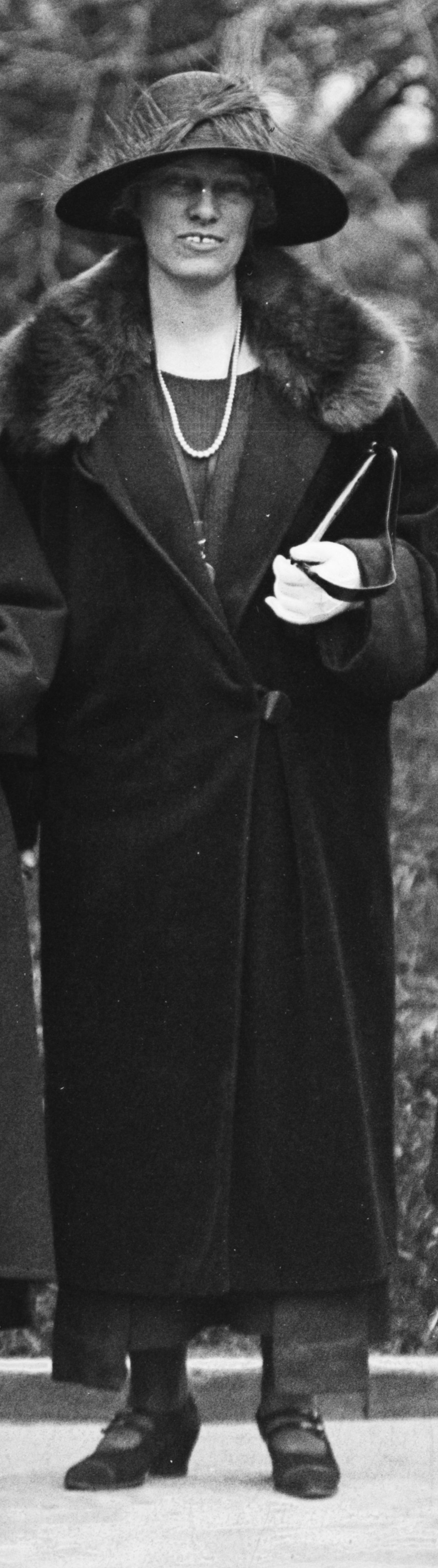
- Died: March 29, 1946; Washington, D.C.
- Occupation: Teacher

Maude E. Aiton (1876 – March 29, 1946) was an American educator and pioneer of adult education, who served as principal of the Webster Americanization School in Washington, D.C. from 1918 to 1945.

== Early life ==
Maude E. Aiton was born on 1876 in Iowa, the daughter of Robert and Sarah Aiton. Her family moved to Washington, D.C., during her childhood, and she graduated from Eastern High School. She received the degrees of B.S., A.B. and M.S. from the National University and earned an L.L.D. degree from the Washington College of Law.

== Career ==
Aiton began her teaching career as a kindergarten teacher in DC public schools and was later the principal of the Webster Americanization School in Washington, D.C. for 26 years until her retirement in 1945. Aiton served as president of the DC Grade Teachers Union from 1919-1920. She was chairman of the Legislative Committee of the National Education Association Department of Adult Education and later served as its president and vice-president.

== Awards and honors ==
Aiton received the American Legion's Distinguished Citizenship Certificate in 1945. Shortly before her death, she received recognition certificates from the Civitan Club of Washington, B'nai Brith, Argo Lodge, and the Americanism Committee of the Daughters of the American Revolution.

== Death and legacy ==
Maude E. Aiton died on 29 March 1946 in Washington, D.C. and is buried in the Congressional Cemetery.
