= Love Fever =

Single by Gayle Adams

from the album Love Fever
- Released: 1981
- Genre: Post-disco
- Length: 4:08 (12" version)
- Label: Prelude PRL 8040 (US)
- Songwriters: Rodney Brown, Willie Lester

Gayle Adams singles chronology
"Stretchin Out" (1980)	"Love Fever" (1981)	"Baby I Need Your Loving" (1982)

"Love Fever" is a song by American singer Gayle Adams. It was released in 1981 by Prelude Records. It was remixed by François Kevorkian.

"Love Fever" peaked at #24 on the Billboard Black Singles and #6 on the Dance chart. By end of January 1982, the position was number 9.

== Track listing ==
=== 1981 release ===
7" vinyl

- US: Prelude / PRL 8040

Side one
No.	Title	Version	Length
1.	"Love Fever"	Vocal	4:08

Side two
No.	Title	Version	Length
1.	"Love Fever"	Instrumental	3:02

== Personnel ==
- Mixing, editing: Francois Kevorkian
- Producer: Rodney Brown, Willie Lester

== Chart performance ==
Chart (1982)	Peak position
US Billboard Black Singles	24
US Billboard Hot Dance Music/Club Play	6
