= Lester A. Dessez =

U.S. Marine Corps brigadier general (1896–1981)

Lester Adolphus Dessez
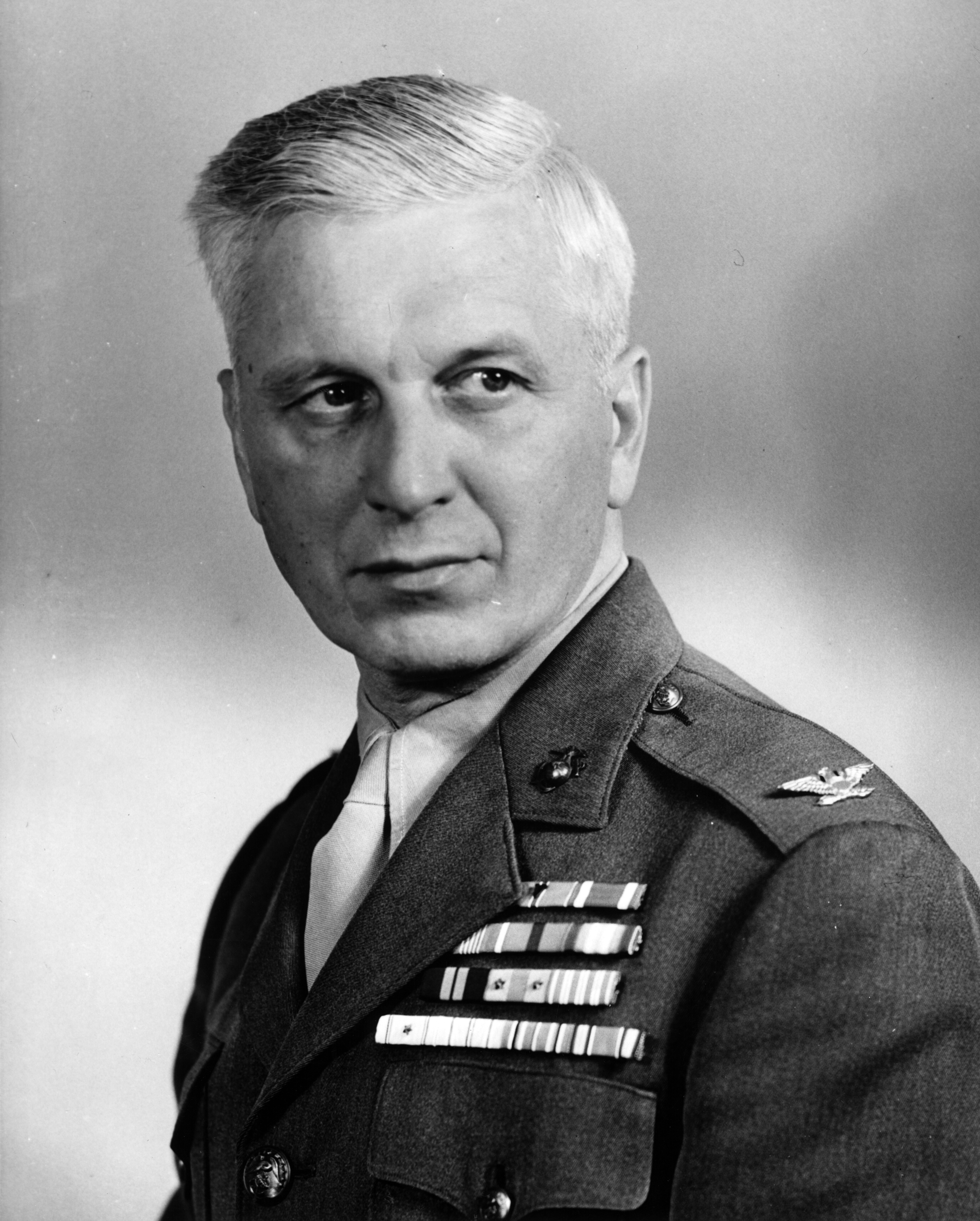
- Dessez as Colonel, USMC
- Born: June 20, 1896; Ballston, Virginia, US
- Died: February 12, 1981 (aged 84); Bethesda, Maryland, US
- Burial place: Arlington National Cemetery
- Relatives: RDM Sumner E. W. Kittelle, USN
- Military career
- Allegiance: United States
- Branch: United States Marine Corps
- Service years: 1917–1948
- Rank: Brigadier General
- Commands: 7th Defense Battalion
- Conflicts: World War I Yangtze Patrol; Banana Wars: Haitian Campaign; Nicaraguan Campaign; World War II
- Awards: Bronze Star Medal; Navy Commendation Medal; Army Commendation Medal

Lester Adolphus Dessez (June 20, 1896 – February 12, 1981) was a decorated officer of the United States Marine Corps with the rank of brigadier general. He is most noted as commanding officer of 7th Defense Battalion during World War II.

== Early career ==
Dessez was born on June 20, 1896, in Ballston, Virginia. His family later moved back to Washington, D.C., and Lester grew up as a fifth-generation Washingtonian. His great-grandfather fought in Battle of Bladensburg in 1814. During his years at Eastern High School, Dessez was a member of student cadets and took part in the summer training camps of Army and Navy during his studies. He first learned about the Marine Corps when he was a student and was attached to the rifle training at Marine Corps Rifle Range at Winthrop, Maryland. He applied for a commission in the Marine Corps and subsequently enlisted the service as private in April 1917.

Dessez was ordered to the Marine Barracks Parris Island, South Carolina, for his recruit training and served few months as an enlisted man. He excelled in his duties and was decorated with Marine Good Conduct Medal. Dessez was finally commissioned second lieutenant in the Marine Corps on October 10, 1917, and was ordered to the Marine Officers' School at Marine Barracks Quantico, Virginia. He finished his officer training in February 1918 and was attached to newly activated 11th Marine Regiment at Marine Barracks Quantico, Virginia.

In July 1918, Lessez received temporary promotion to the rank of first lieutenant and later was appointed Aide-de-camp to barracks commander, Brigadier General Albertus W. Catlin. When General Catlin was ordered to Haiti at the beginning of November 1918, to assume command of 1st Provisional Marine Brigade, he requested Dessez as his aide again. Dessez followed General Catlin again in September 1919, when the general was ordered back to the States for retirement.

== Between the wars ==
Dessez did not remained in the States for long, because he was ordered to China in December 1919 for guard duty at American Legation in Peking. Because the war was over, he was also reverted to his permanent rank of second lieutenant. Dessez left China in April 1921 and received permanent promotion to the rank of first lieutenant. He subsequently travelled to Vladivostok to join Marine detachment aboard the gunboat USS Helena. While aboard that vessel, he participated in Yangtze Patrol until August 1921.

Following his detachment from USS Helena, Dessez joined Marine barracks at Naval Station Cavite, Philippine Islands, and served there until January 1922. Upon his return stateside, he was attached to the 2nd Battalion, 5th Marines at Quantico as commander of 18th Company. While in this assignment, Dessez was attached to the Company Officers' Course at Marine Corps Schools, Quantico and graduated in June 1924.

He was then ordered to Haiti in July of that year and appointed Aide-de-camp to the American High Commissioner and commander of First Marine Brigade, Major General John H. Russell. In his capacity, Dessez did not see much combat and returned to the United States in July 1926. He then served as post exchange officer and post adjutant within Marine Barracks, Washington Navy Yard until December 1927.

Nonetheless Dessez remained in Washington and was attached to the local Marine barracks as post adjutant again. He later assumed duties as barracks detachment commanding officer at these barracks and also was promoted to the rank of captain in March 1928.

The sea duties came in late 1928, when he was appointed commanding officer of the Marine detachment aboard the battleship USS Maryland and took part in the several patrol cruises in Caribbean during Nicaraguan Campaign.

After brief service at Marine Barracks, Norfolk Naval Shipyard from May to August 1930, Dessez was appointed Aide-de-camp to the Commandant of the Marine Corps, Ben H. Fuller. Dessez remained with the Office of Commandant just until November 1930 and then sailed to Paris, France, to attend the prestigious Ecole Superieure de Guerre, French General Staff School. While in Paris, Dessez attended also the Alliance Française and Sorbonne University and improved his knowledge of the French language.

He was promoted to the rank of major in August 1937 and ordered back to the States at the same time. Dessez was then attached to the staff of Marine Corps Schools, Quantico, as an instructor until July 1940. Dessez was promoted to the rank of lieutenant colonel following his departure from Quantico and subsequently assumed duties as an inspector-instructor with 10th Battalion, Marine Corps Reserve in New Orleans, Louisiana.

== World War II ==
Dessez was transferred to San Diego, California, and appointed assistant operations officer of 8th Marine Regiment under Colonel Henry L. Larsen. With the increasing danger of Japanese expansion to the South Pacific and threat to the U.S. Naval Bases, Navy Department developed, with the cooperation of Marine Corps Headquarters, the concept of Marine defense battalions. Dessez was tasked with the formation and initial training of 7th Defense Battalion at San Diego on December 16, 1940.

His battalion consisted of the batteries with 5"/51 caliber guns, searchlight and aircraft sound locator and antiaircraft groups with M2 Browning and M1917 Browning machine guns and were ideal for the defense of the islands from the attack from the sea and air.

In March 1941, Dessez led his battalion to Tutuila, American Samoa, within Rainbow Five plans. During his time in Tutuila, Dessez and his battalion were tasked with the training of 1st Samoan Battalion, a native reserve unit. He later supervised the deployment of his units to Upolu and Savai'i and also helped train units there.

Following the Japanese Attack on Pearl Harbor in December 1941, Dessez and his unit provided the defense of the Samoan archipelago against air and land attack. He was later cited by commanding general of Second Marine Brigade, Henry L. Larsen, and received the Bronze Star Medal with Combat "V". Dessez was also promoted to the rank of colonel in May 1942.

Dessez was ordered back to the States in January 1943 and assigned to the instruction at Army Infantry School at Fort Benning, Georgia and graduated two months later.

He then served with V Amphibious Corps under Major General Holland Smith as corps personnel officer and later as corps chief of staff until December 1943. He then departed San Diego in order to attend instruction at Command and General Staff College at Fort Leavenworth, Kansas. Dessez was subsequently attached to the Office of Chief of Naval Operations, Admiral Ernest King as Marine staff member. Dessez remained in this capacity for the remainder of the war and received the Navy Commendation Medal for his service there.

== Postwar service ==
Dessez was ordered to Guam in January 1946 and appointed chief of staff of the Island Command under his old superior, Major General Henry L. Larsen. With the establishment of the Marine Barracks there, he became the commanding officer of that facility. He also served additional duty as director of island security and served on Guam until December 1947.

His final assignment was again with the Office of Chief of Naval Operations under Admiral Louis E. Denfeld. Dessez also served with the Joint Chiefs of Staff and received Army Commendation Medal. He retired from the active service on November 1, 1948, and was advanced to the rank of brigadier general for having been specially commended in combat.

Upon his retirement from the Marine Corps, Dessez served as a member of the Marine Corps Historical Foundation and was supporter of the Marine Corps Historical Program. He died on February 12, 1981, in Bethesda, Maryland, and is buried at Arlington National Cemetery.

== Decorations ==
Here is the ribbon bar of Brigadier General Lester A. Dessez:

1st Row	Bronze Star Medal with Combat "V"	Navy Commendation Medal	Army Commendation Medal	Marine Good Conduct Medal
2nd Row	World War I Victory Medal	Haitian Campaign Medal	Marine Corps Expeditionary Medal with two stars	Second Nicaraguan Campaign Medal
3rd Row	American Defense Service Medal with Base Clasp	Asiatic-Pacific Campaign Medal	American Campaign Medal	World War II Victory Medal
