= Aedes atropalpus =

Scientific classification
- Kingdom: Animalia
- Phylum: Arthropoda
- Clade: Pancrustacea
- Class: Insecta
- Order: Diptera
- Family: Culicidae
- Genus: Aedes
- Subgenus: Georgecraigius
- Species: A. atropalpus

Binomial name
- Aedes atropalpus (Coquillett, 1902)

Species of dipterans

Aedes atropalpus, also known by its common name American rock pool mosquito is a species from the subgenus Georgecraigius. The species was originally described by Daniel William Coquillett in 1902
