= Dallas Shirley =

American basketball referee (1913–1994)

Dallas Shirley (June 7, 1913 in Washington, D.C. – March 1, 1994) was an American basketball referee. He officiated more than 2000 basketball games in his 33-year career, which ended in 1966. He was the International Association of Approved Basketball Officials president from 1952 to 1953. He took part in the 1960 Summer Olympics in Rome, officiating basketball. He was a member of the first NBA officiating crew. He was enshrined in the Basketball Hall of Fame in 1980.

In 1994, Shirley donated a collection of documents and memorabilia to The George Washington University. The collection includes pennants, patches, trophies, media guides, scrapbooks, and photographs. It is currently under the care of the university's Special Collections Research Center, located in the Estelle and Melvin Gelman Library.
