= John White Moore =

- Born: May 21, 1832; Plattsburgh, New York
- Died: March 31, 1913 (aged 80); Ridgewood, New Jersey
- Military career
- Allegiance: United States
- Branch: United States Navy
- Service years: 1853–1894
- Rank: Rear admiral
- Conflicts: American Civil War; Spanish–American War

John White Moore (May 21, 1832 – March 31, 1913) was a rear admiral of the United States Navy.

== Biography ==
Born at Plattsburgh, New York on May 21, 1832, he was appointed third assistant engineer in the Navy in 1853 and was promoted to chief engineer in 1861. During the Civil War he took part in the engagements with the ram CSS Manassas and in the capture of the defenses of Pensacola in 1861; in the passage and capture of Forts Jackson and St. Philip, the capture of New Orleans, the passage of the Vicksburg batteries, and the fight with the ram CSS Arkansas in 1862; and in the capture of Port Hudson in 1863.

Moore originated the use of chain cables to protect the sides of wooden ships, of a paint designed to render the fighting ships less easily visible, and of the fighting tops found on the masts of many large war vessels.

He retired in 1894 with the rank of commodore, but during the Spanish–American War he served as an inspector in the New York Navy Yard. For his services in the Civil War he was raised to the rank of rear admiral in 1906.

In 1894, he purchased land in Bolton Landing, New York and built a summer home on Lake George. The buildings and property are now owned by Rensselaer Polytechnic Institute and used by the Darrin Freshwater Institute.

John White Moore died at his home in Ridgewood, New Jersey, on March 31, 1913.
