= Gayle Adams =

American musician

- Born: January 5, 1952 (age 74); Washington, D.C., United States
- Genres: Disco, house, post-disco, urban contemporary
- Occupation: Musician
- Instrument: Vocals
- Years active: 1980–1989
- Label: Prelude Records

Gayle Adams is an American urban contemporary and house music musician, who is best known for her hit singles "Love Fever", "Stretch'in Out" and "Your Love Is a Lifesaver."

== Background ==
She recorded two albums for the dance-oriented Prelude record label in the early 1980s, which were written and produced by the Washington D.C.–based record producers, Willie Lester and guitarist Rodney Brown. Adams most successful single was "Love Fever", which reached number six on the US dance charts, and number 24 on the soul singles chart in 1981. "Stretch'in Out" peaked at number 64 in the UK Singles Chart in July 1980. Her most recent hit single was "I'm Warning You" (1984).

== Discography ==
=== Studio albums ===
- Gayle Adams (Prelude, 1980)
- Love Fever (Prelude, 1982)

=== Compilation albums ===
- Gayle Adams / Love Fever (Deepbeats, 1997)

=== Singles ===
Year	Single	Peak chart positions		
Year	Single	US R&B	US Dance	UK
1980	"Plain Out of Luck"	―	—	—
1980	"Stretch'in Out"	75	12	64
1980	"Your Love Is a Life Saver"	—	―	―
1981	"Love Fever"	24	6	—
1982	"Baby I Need Your Loving"	—	—	—
1983	"Emergency / Love Attraction"	—	—	—
1984	"I'm Warning You"	—	—	86
1987	"Love Triangle" (with Tyrone Brunson)	—	—	—
1989	"Don't Waste My Time"	—	—	—
"—" denotes releases that did not chart or were not released in that territory.
