= Mark Martin (politician) =

American politician (born 1968)

33rd Secretary of State of Arkansas
- In office January 2011 – January 15, 2019
- Governor: Mike Beebe; Asa Hutchinson
- Preceded by: Charlie Daniels
- Succeeded by: John Thurston

Member of the Arkansas House of Representatives from the 87th district
- In office January 2005 – January 11, 2011
- Preceded by: Sarah Agee
- Succeeded by: Justin Harris

Personal details
- Born: Mark Russell Martin; February 18, 1968 (age 58) Kansas City, Kansas, U.S.
- Party: Republican
- Spouse: Sharon Tilley
- Children: 3
- Education: University of Arkansas (BS)
- Occupation: Engineer

Military service
- Branch/service: United States Navy

Mark Russell Martin (born February 18, 1968) is an American politician who served as the secretary of state of Arkansas from January 2011 to January 2019. He is a former three-term member of the Arkansas House of Representatives for District 87 in Washington County in Northwest Arkansas.

== Electoral history ==
Arkansas House of Representatives 87th District Republican Primary Election, 2004
Party	Candidate	Votes	%
Republican	Mark Martin	553	71.08
Republican	Leonard Frederick	225	28.92

Arkansas House of Representatives 87th District Election, 2004
Party	Candidate	Votes	%
Republican	Mark Martin	5,738	55.15
Democratic	Lloyd Keck	4,667	44.85

Arkansas House of Representatives 87th District Election, 2006
Party	Candidate	Votes	%
Republican	Mark Martin (inc.)	4,715	61.32
Independent	Jimmie Johnson	2,974	38.68

Arkansas House of Representatives 87th District Election, 2008
Party	Candidate	Votes	%
Republican	Mark Martin (inc.)	6,441	58.82
Democratic	Earl Hunton	4,510	41.18

Arkansas Secretary of State Election, 2010
Party	Candidate	Votes	%
Republican	Mark Martin	392,468	51.33
Democratic	Pat O'Brien	372,123	48.67

Arkansas Secretary of State Election, 2014
Party	Candidate	Votes	%
Republican	Mark Martin (inc.)	506,384	60.61
Democratic	Susan Inman	292,878	35.06
Libertarian	Jacob Holloway	36,159	4.33

Party political offices
Preceded by Jim Lagrone	Republican nominee for Secretary of State of Arkansas; 2010, 2014	Succeeded by John Thurston
Arkansas House of Representatives
Preceded by Sarah Agee	Member of the Arkansas House of Representatives from the 87th district 2005–2011	Succeeded by Justin Harris
Political offices
Preceded by Charlie Daniels	Secretary of State of Arkansas; 2011–2019	Succeeded by John Thurston
