= Vernon D. Acree =

11th Commissioner of the United States Customs Service
- In office May 2, 1972 – April 30, 1977
- President: Richard Nixon; Gerald Ford
- Preceded by: Myles Ambrose
- Succeeded by: Robert E. Chasen

Personal details
- Born: Vernon Darrell Acree; June 25, 1919; Washington, D.C.
- Died: February 1, 2013 (aged 93); Fairfax, Virginia
- Political party: Republican

Vernon D. Acree (June 25, 1919 – February 1, 2013) was an American administrator who served as Commissioner of the United States Customs Service from 1972 to 1977. He served in the United States Army during World War II.

He died of pneumonia on February 1, 2013, in Fairfax, Virginia at age 93.
