= Mary Anne Edmunds =

Welsh educator (1813–1858)

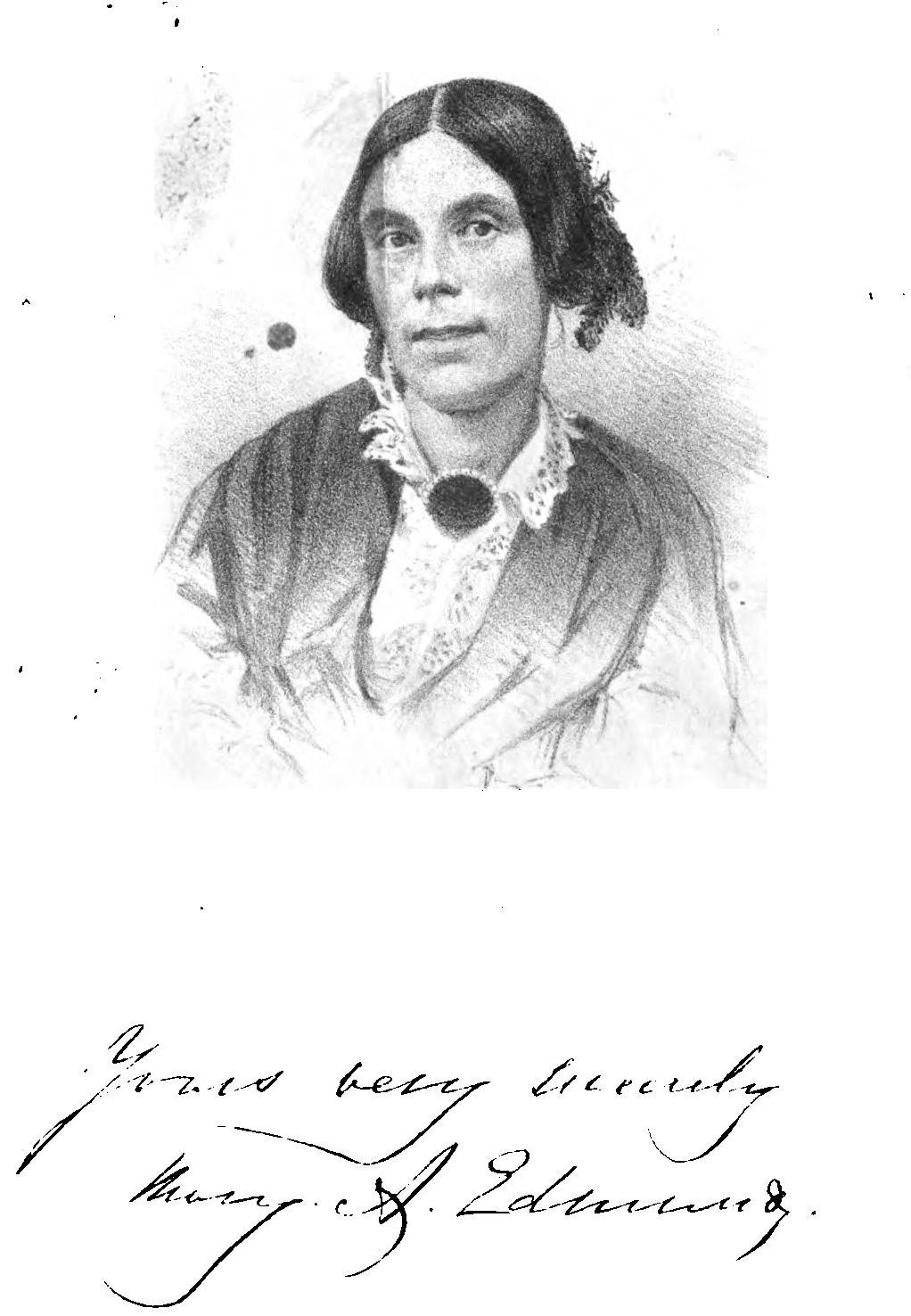
Drawing of Mary Anne Edmunds

Mary Anne Edmunds, née Jones, (25 April 1813 – 22 March 1858) was a Welsh educator.

== Biography ==
Edmunds was born on 25 April 1813 in Carmarthen and was the daughter of William and Mary Jones. She was raised in a Calvinistic Methodist family and had one brother J. W. Jones. She was educated at a boarding school and also received an education from her home where she acquired a large knowledge of the scriptures. Edmunds was also an avid reader of edifying books and was proficient in Welsh hymnology. She kept diaries in the English language over the next 20 years where she recorded her religious emotions and prayers. Edmunds' extensive knowledge of the language was shown through hymns she had written. Most of the extracts were stern and self-critical.

She sought to promote education in Wales, during a period when people were unaware of its importance. She became a Sunday school teacher and throughout her life, was an active and faithful supporter of literary and temperance societies. Edmunds had wanted to work in education from an early age and succeeded in gaining admission to the British and Foreign School Society's Training College in London in March 1847. She was appointed as a teacher at the Society School in Ruthin in October 1847. Edmunds was transferred to Bangor where she started the British School at Garth in January 1849. The following year she married John Edmunds (1815–1886) who was the headteacher of a nearby school. They had two sons.

During her time in Bangor, she established a competitive examination that would occur every six weeks between the boys' and girls' schools. Fraternising between pupils of the two schools was discouraged, and unlike the writers of the Reports of the Commissioners of Inquiry into the state of education in Wales, Edmunds had a strong opinion that the male was as much to be blamed as the female. Edmunds died on 22 March 1858. Her memoirs were published by John Edmunds and J. W. Jones after her death which included an essay. Edmunds was apparently considered an early example of a feminist.
