= Mary Ellen Edmunds =

American LDS missionary and speaker (1940–2026)

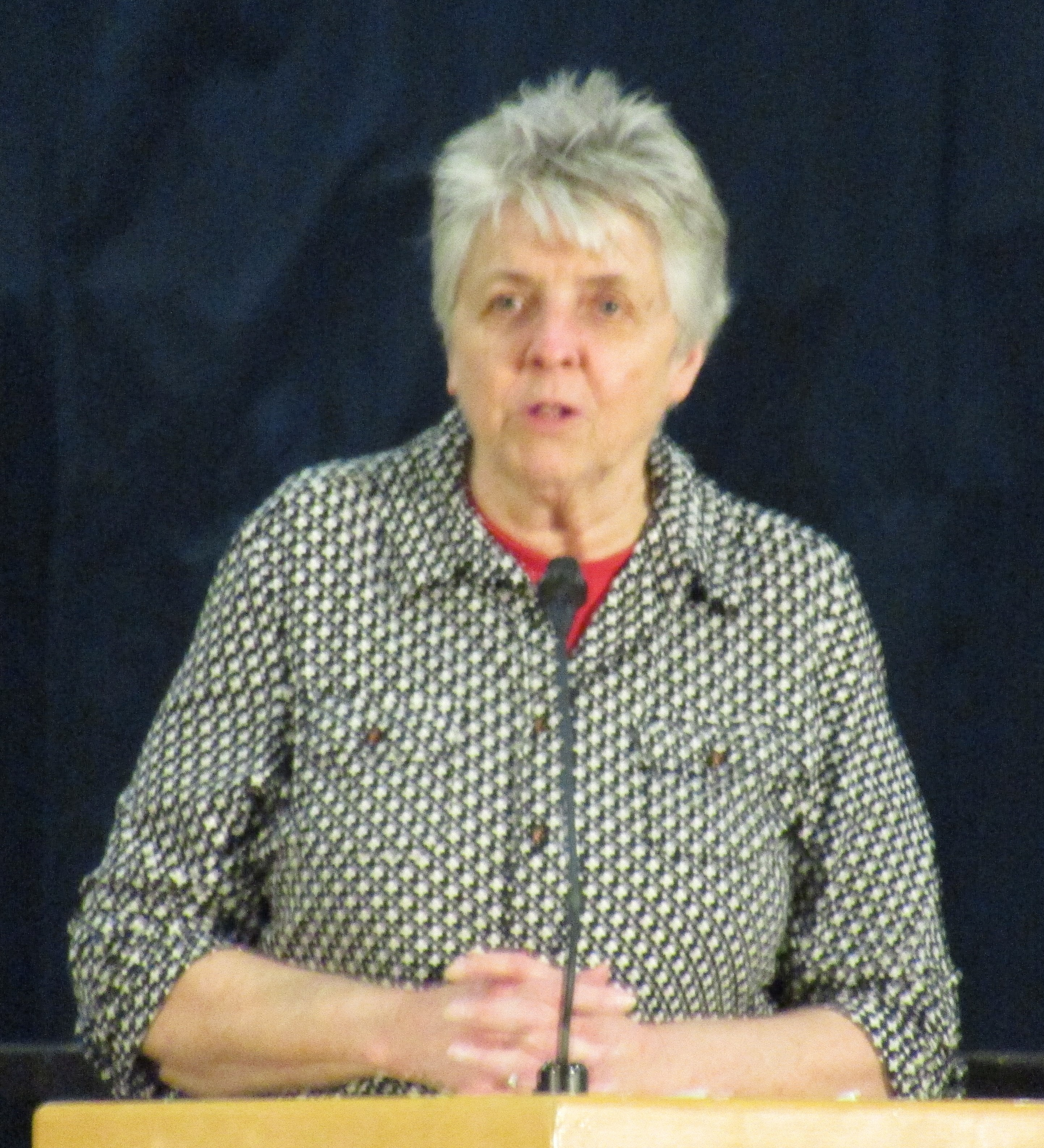
- Edmunds in 2018
- Born: March 3, 1940; Los Angeles, California, U.S.
- Died: May 21, 2026 (aged 86)
- Occupations: Religious public speaker, author

Mary Ellen Edmunds (March 3, 1940 – May 21, 2026) was an American religious public speaker, author and nurse. A member of the Church of Jesus Christ of Latter-day Saints (LDS Church), she was the Director of Training in the Missionary Training Center in Provo, Utah from 1978 to 1995. She also served as a member of the Relief Society general board. Edmunds also served as an LDS missionary in Taiwan, Hong Kong, the Philippines, and Indonesia. She was the director of the Thrasher International Program for Children in Nigeria for a short time.

== Early life and education ==
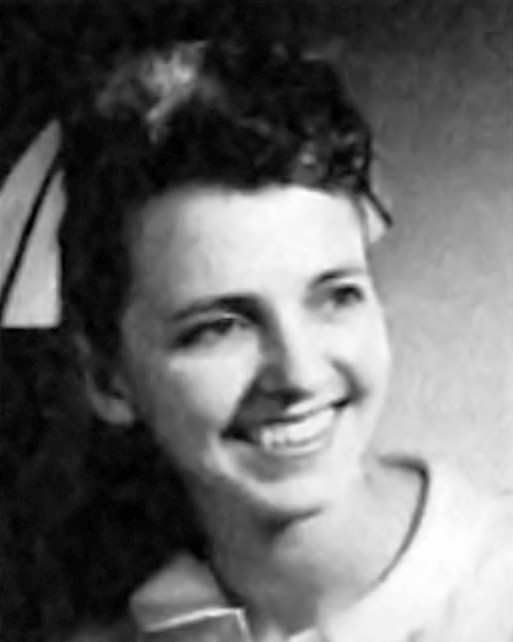
Edmunds in 1962

Mary Ellen Edmunds was born in Los Angeles, California, on March 3, 1940. Her family moved to Cedar City, Utah, in 1943. Her father was a doctor and her mother was a nurse. She was the second of eight children. As a child, she enjoyed playing the violin. When she was a teenager, she worked at Zion National Park for two summers.

She attended Brigham Young High School, where she contributed to the newspaper, yearbook, and campus magazines. She was a member of Quill and Scroll. Edmunds enjoyed playing sports. Her family moved to Mapleton, Utah, before her senior year of high school. She graduated from high school in 1958 and went on to attend Brigham Young University (BYU). She graduated in 1962 with a nursing degree. She would later teach at BYU. After graduating, she served as a missionary for the LDS Church in the Southern Far East Mission from 1962 to 1964.

== Nursing career ==
Edmunds began teaching at BYU as a nursing instructor in 1965. She taught until 1970. She left BYU to become the nursing supervisor and instructor at the Utah Valley Hospital, where she worked from 1970 to 1972. Following that position, she became the coordinator of health missionaries for the LDS Church.

== Church service ==
=== Missions ===
Edmunds served multiple missions for the Church of Jesus Christ of Latter-Day Saints. From 1962 through 1964, she served in the Southern Far East Mission, which included four months in Taiwan, five months in Hong Kong, and 15 months in the Philippines. She was one of the first two female missionaries to be sent to the Philippines. She later returned as the first health missionary to the Philippines Manila Mission from 1972 to 1973. In 1976-1978, she was called to serve in the Indonesia Djakarta Mission as a welfare services missionary, and was also the first female Latter-Day Saint missionary there.

=== Missionary Training Center and Relief Society ===
Edmunds was called in 1978 to be the Associate Director of Special Training at the Missionary Training Center (MTC) in Provo, Utah. She was called to be the Director of Training that same year. She helped oversee the training of all Asian-language and welfare missionaries. She retired from that position in September 1995. During that time, she also worked as the Coordinator of Health Missionaries for the church from 1973 to 1975.

She worked as the director of Thrasher International Program for Children, a health initiative in Nigeria in 1984. She had planned on being in Nigeria for three years, but had to return home early due to illness. After returning from Nigeria, Edmunds was a member of the Relief Society General Board from 1986 to 1997.

=== Author and public speaker ===
Edmunds wrote a number of books. She was an instructor at Education Week at BYU in Provo, Idaho, and Hawaii. She also participated in Especially for Youth programs. Many of her books are inspirational and filled with her suggestions on how to live a happier life. She incorporated stories from her mission and added touches of humor.

Her published works include:

- Love is a Verb. 1995.
- Thoughts for a Bad Hair Day. Deseret Book Company. 1995. ISBN 0875799523.
- Happiness, Finders, Keepers. Deseret Book Company. 1999. ISBN 1573455563.
- Africa: Big Lessons From A Little Village. 2003.
- MEE Thinks: Random Thoughts on Life's Wrinkles. Deseret Book Company. 2004. ISBN 1590383125.
- You Can Never Get Enough of What You Don't Need: The Quest for Contentment. 2005.
- Peculiar in a Good Way. Deseret Book Company. 2006. ISBN 1590386639.
- Gratitude: The Theory of Relativity. 2006.
- Keeping it Together in a Pull-Apart World. Deseret Book Company. 2007. ISBN 978-1590387542.
- MEE Speaks: But Does She Have Anything to Say?. Deseret Book Company. 2008. ISBN 978-1590388877.
- Edmunds, Mary Ellen (2011). Buck Up, Little Buckaroo. Deseret Book. ISBN 978-1606419496.
- Tug of War: Choosing Between Zion and Babylon. Deseret Book Company. 2013. ISBN 978-1609070564.

== Other contributions ==
Edmunds was a member of the Utah County Board of Health from 1988 to 1998. She was a Trustee of the Utah South Region International Council on Harmonisation Governing Board from 1998 through 2003. She was also a member of the Technical Advisory Committee for the Thrasher Research Fund.

== Death ==
Edmunds died on May 21, 2026, at the age of 86.

== Awards ==
Edmunds received the Alumni Distinguished Service Award from BYU in 1982 to honor her accomplishments. From that university she also received the Exemplary Womanhood Award in 1984 and the Humanitarian Award in 1986. She was made Elect Lady in 1989 by Lambda Delta Sigma, the national woman's sorority. She was also awarded the Presidential Citation by BYU in 1994. In 2005, the Mary Ellen Edmunds Nursing Endowment for the Healer's Art was made by the BYU College of Nursing to commemorate her.
