= Simon Moore (Royal Navy officer) =

Royal Navy Rear Admiral CB (born 1946)

Rear Admiral Simon Moore CB (born 25 September 1946) is a retired Royal Navy officer and a former Assistant Chief of Defence Staff for Operations. He was educated at Brentwood School in Essex.

He is an ex Chair of Governors at Hurstpierpoint College, a Vice President of the Maritime Volunteer Service and a Charity Trustee of The British Youth Opera.
