= Charles Brainard Taylor Moore =

US Navy admiral (1853–1923)

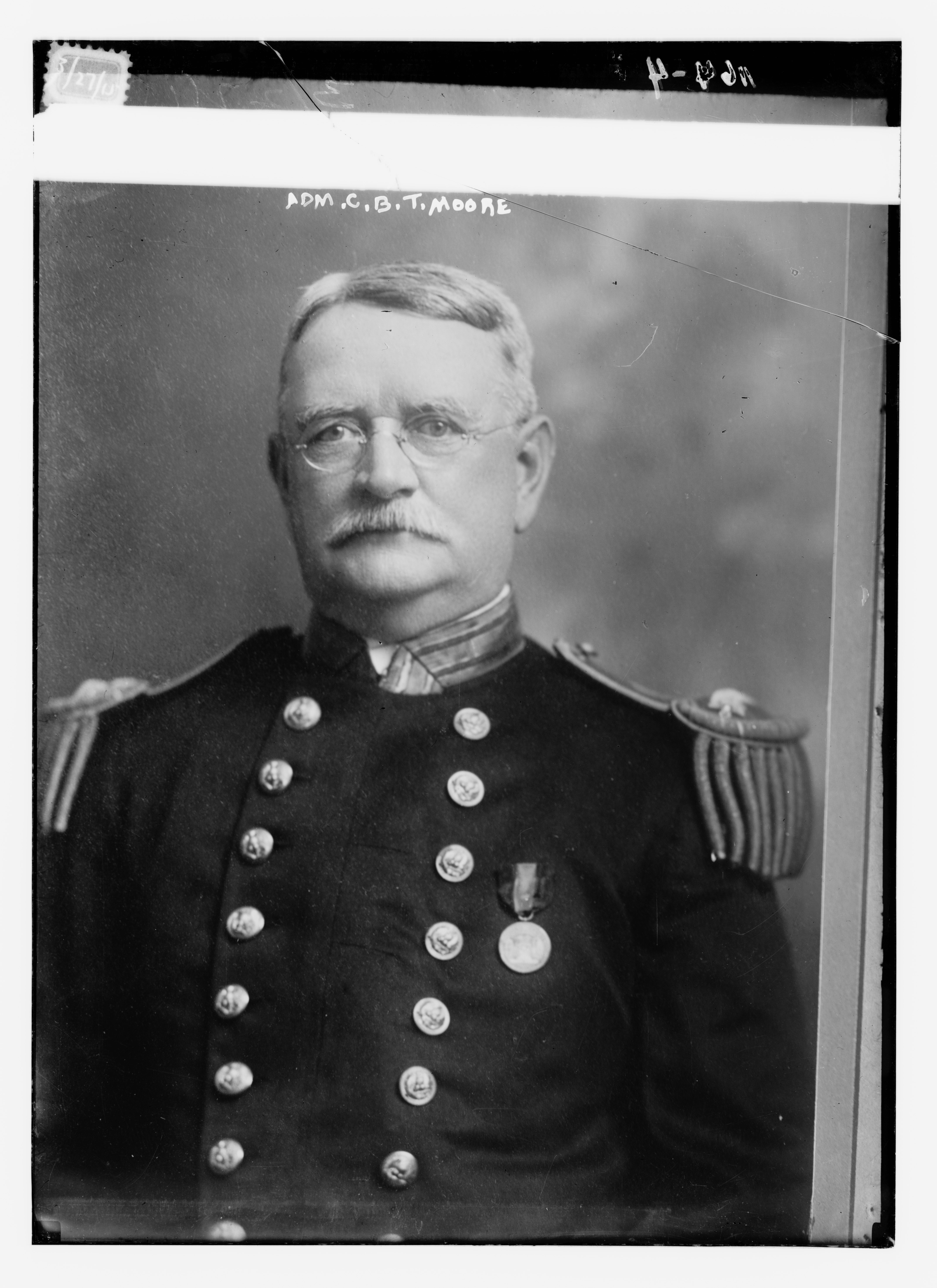
- Born: 1853; Decatur, Illinois
- Died: April 4, 1923 (aged 70); Philadelphia Naval Hospital
- Military career
- Allegiance: United States
- Branch: United States Navy
- Service years: 1873 - 1915
- Rank: Rear Admiral

Charles Brainard Taylor Moore (1853 – April 4, 1923) was a rear admiral in the United States Navy and naval governor of American Samoa from 1905 to 1908. Taylor was born in Decatur, Illinois. He graduated from the Naval Academy in 1873. Moore was the first Governor of American Samoa to receive a formal appointment from the President of the United States. He established the Annual Meetings of the Territory, allowing traditional leaders to discuss topics of interest with the Governor and offer suggestions. These meetings marked the first time that Tutuila Island and the Manuʻa Islands convened as a unified government under the same authority. Drawing inspiration from Governor Wilhelm Solf's success in Western Samoa, Moore requested the U.S. Navy to extend governors' terms to four years, but this was denied. However, he was allowed to serve nearly three and a half years, longer than any other Navy Governor except John Martin Poyer. Moore advanced legislative authority for American Samoans and enacted more territorial laws than his predecessors. He abolished the customs of auosoga and faamasei’au and drafted the first matai law, ensuring matai titles were registered and disputes were legally resolved. In 1907, he made the first appropriation requests from Washington, D.C., seeking $6,000 for schools, $6,000 for hospitals, and $5,000 for roads.

In 1907, Governor Moore issued “Regulation No. 1-1907 – Cricket Game,” prohibiting cricket and other sporting contests between individuals from different villages or different countries unless prior written permission was obtained from the Governor. Violations were punishable by a fine of up to $15 or imprisonment, with or without hard labor.

He died at the Philadelphia Naval Hospital, on April 4, 1923.
