= 2018 Arkansas Commissioner of State Lands election =

- November 6, 2018
| Candidate | Tommy Land | Larry Williams |
| Party | Republican | Democratic |
| Popular vote | 530,230 | 323,682 |
| Percentage | 60.05% | 36.66% |
- Land: 40–50% 50–60% 60–70% 70–80% 80–90% Williams: 40–50% 50–60% 60–70%
Commissioner before election
John Thurston
Republican
Elected Commissioner
Tommy Land
Republican

The 2018 Arkansas Commissioner of State Lands election was held on November 6, 2018, to elect the Arkansas Commissioner of State Lands. Incumbent Republican Land Commissioner John Thurston was term-limited and ran for secretary of state. Republican Tommy Land defeated Democrat Larry Williams to succeed Thurston.

== Republican primary ==
=== Candidates ===
==== Nominee ====
- Tommy Land, businessman

==== Withdrew ====
- Alex Ray, business consultant

== Democratic primary ==
=== Candidates ===
==== Nominee ====
- Larry Williams, former Garland County judge

== Libertarian primary ==
=== Candidates ===
==== Nominee ====
- T.J. Campbell

== General election ==
=== Results ===
2018 Arkansas Commissioner of State Lands election
| Party | Candidate | Votes | % | ±% |
|---|---|---|---|---|
| Republican | Tommy Land | 530,230 | 60.05 | +2.88 |
| Democratic | Larry Williams | 323,682 | 36.66 | +0.07 |
| Libertarian | T.J. Campbell | 29,123 | 3.30 | –2.94 |
| Total votes | | 883,035 | 100.00 | N/A |
| Republican hold | | | | |

==== By county ====
| County | Tommy Land Republican | | Larry Williams Democratic | | T.J. Campbell Libertarian | | Margin | | Total |
| County | # | % | # | % | # | % | # | % | Total |
|---|---|---|---|---|---|---|---|---|---|
| Arkansas | 3,156 | 63.99% | 1,653 | 33.52% | 123 | 2.49% | 1,503 | 30.47% | 4,932 |
| Ashley | 4,055 | 65.90% | 2,008 | 32.63% | 90 | 1.46% | 2,047 | 33.27% | 6,153 |
| Baxter | 10,198 | 71.47% | 3,384 | 23.72% | 687 | 4.81% | 6,814 | 47.75% | 14,269 |
| Benton | 48,875 | 63.85% | 24,700 | 32.27% | 2,973 | 3.88% | 24,175 | 31.58% | 76,548 |
| Boone | 8,723 | 75.44% | 2,465 | 21.32% | 375 | 3.24% | 6,258 | 54.12% | 11,563 |
| Bradley | 1,704 | 59.77% | 1,078 | 37.81% | 69 | 2.42% | 626 | 21.96% | 2,851 |
| Calhoun | 1,229 | 69.08% | 513 | 28.84% | 37 | 2.08% | 716 | 40.25% | 1,779 |
| Carroll | 5,338 | 59.81% | 3,296 | 36.93% | 291 | 3.26% | 2,042 | 22.88% | 8,925 |
| Chicot | 1,440 | 40.74% | 2,037 | 57.62% | 58 | 1.64% | -597 | -16.89% | 3,535 |
| Clark | 3,605 | 53.50% | 2,993 | 44.42% | 140 | 2.08% | 612 | 9.08% | 6,738 |
| Clay | 2,741 | 66.92% | 1,218 | 29.74% | 137 | 3.34% | 1,523 | 37.18% | 4,096 |
| Cleburne | 7,714 | 80.15% | 1,677 | 17.42% | 234 | 2.43% | 6,037 | 62.72% | 9,625 |
| Cleveland | 1,912 | 73.88% | 622 | 24.03% | 54 | 2.09% | 1,290 | 49.85% | 2,588 |
| Columbia | 3,968 | 62.67% | 2,253 | 35.58% | 111 | 1.75% | 1,715 | 27.08% | 6,332 |
| Conway | 3,805 | 59.41% | 2,406 | 37.56% | 194 | 3.03% | 1,399 | 21.84% | 6,405 |
| Craighead | 16,393 | 63.32% | 8,570 | 33.10% | 925 | 3.57% | 7,823 | 30.22% | 25,888 |
| Crawford | 12,490 | 74.53% | 3,687 | 22.00% | 582 | 3.47% | 8,803 | 52.53% | 16,759 |
| Crittenden | 5,274 | 44.30% | 6,369 | 53.50% | 261 | 2.19% | -1,095 | -9.20% | 11,904 |
| Cross | 3,883 | 67.04% | 1,736 | 29.97% | 173 | 2.99% | 2,147 | 37.07% | 5,792 |
| Dallas | 1,170 | 55.37% | 910 | 43.07% | 33 | 1.56% | 260 | 12.30% | 2,113 |
| Desha | 1,463 | 43.13% | 1,860 | 54.83% | 69 | 2.03% | -397 | -11.70% | 3,392 |
| Drew | 3,199 | 60.13% | 1,979 | 37.20% | 142 | 2.67% | 1,220 | 22.93% | 5,320 |
| Faulkner | 23,588 | 61.90% | 13,035 | 34.21% | 1,485 | 3.90% | 10,553 | 27.69% | 38,108 |
| Franklin | 3,687 | 69.95% | 1,379 | 26.16% | 205 | 3.89% | 2,308 | 43.79% | 5,271 |
| Fulton | 2,532 | 67.14% | 1,126 | 29.86% | 113 | 3.00% | 1,406 | 37.28% | 3,771 |
| Garland | 19,544 | 61.78% | 11,105 | 35.11% | 984 | 3.11% | 8,439 | 26.68% | 31,633 |
| Grant | 4,240 | 76.52% | 1,153 | 20.81% | 148 | 2.67% | 3,087 | 55.71% | 5,541 |
| Greene | 7,982 | 73.20% | 2,590 | 23.75% | 333 | 3.05% | 5,392 | 49.45% | 10,905 |
| Hempstead | 3,153 | 63.53% | 1,714 | 34.54% | 96 | 1.93% | 1,439 | 28.99% | 4,963 |
| Hot Spring | 5,717 | 65.48% | 2,771 | 31.74% | 243 | 2.78% | 2,946 | 33.74% | 8,731 |
| Howard | 2,318 | 65.96% | 1,133 | 32.24% | 63 | 1.79% | 1,185 | 33.72% | 3,514 |
| Independence | 7,378 | 73.01% | 2,402 | 23.77% | 325 | 3.22% | 4,976 | 49.24% | 10,105 |
| Izard | 3,271 | 73.37% | 1,051 | 23.58% | 136 | 3.05% | 2,220 | 49.80% | 4,458 |
| Jackson | 2,604 | 62.48% | 1,440 | 34.55% | 124 | 2.98% | 1,164 | 27.93% | 4,168 |
| Jefferson | 7,155 | 36.53% | 12,053 | 61.54% | 379 | 1.93% | -4,898 | -25.01% | 19,587 |
| Johnson | 4,756 | 64.23% | 2,358 | 31.84% | 291 | 3.93% | 2,398 | 32.38% | 7,405 |
| Lafayette | 1,299 | 60.96% | 800 | 37.54% | 32 | 1.50% | 499 | 23.42% | 2,131 |
| Lawrence | 3,161 | 68.15% | 1,280 | 27.60% | 197 | 4.25% | 1,881 | 40.56% | 4,638 |
| Lee | 840 | 40.27% | 1,205 | 57.77% | 41 | 1.97% | -365 | -17.50% | 2,086 |
| Lincoln | 1,906 | 63.34% | 1,024 | 34.03% | 79 | 2.63% | 882 | 29.31% | 3,009 |
| Little River | 2,672 | 67.99% | 1,175 | 29.90% | 83 | 2.11% | 1,497 | 38.09% | 3,930 |
| Logan | 3,912 | 71.11% | 1,396 | 25.38% | 193 | 3.51% | 2,516 | 45.74% | 5,501 |
| Lonoke | 14,956 | 72.91% | 4,869 | 23.74% | 687 | 3.35% | 10,087 | 49.18% | 20,512 |
| Madison | 3,599 | 65.64% | 1,708 | 31.15% | 176 | 3.21% | 1,891 | 34.49% | 5,483 |
| Marion | 3,801 | 73.83% | 1,170 | 22.73% | 177 | 3.44% | 2,631 | 51.11% | 5,148 |
| Miller | 8,118 | 71.14% | 3,101 | 27.17% | 193 | 1.69% | 5,017 | 43.96% | 11,412 |
| Mississippi | 5,735 | 55.51% | 4,274 | 41.37% | 323 | 3.13% | 1,461 | 14.14% | 10,332 |
| Monroe | 1,244 | 47.81% | 1,296 | 49.81% | 62 | 2.38% | -52 | -2.00% | 2,602 |
| Montgomery | 2,070 | 72.86% | 696 | 24.50% | 75 | 2.64% | 1,374 | 48.36% | 2,841 |
| Nevada | 1,524 | 60.50% | 953 | 37.83% | 42 | 1.67% | 571 | 22.67% | 2,519 |
| Newton | 2,241 | 71.92% | 769 | 24.68% | 106 | 3.40% | 1,472 | 47.24% | 3,116 |
| Ouachita | 3,815 | 51.69% | 3,422 | 46.36% | 144 | 1.95% | 393 | 5.32% | 7,381 |
| Perry | 2,434 | 66.23% | 1,106 | 30.10% | 135 | 3.67% | 1,328 | 36.14% | 3,675 |
| Phillips | 1,989 | 36.78% | 3,290 | 60.84% | 129 | 2.39% | -1,301 | -24.06% | 5,408 |
| Pike | 2,459 | 73.58% | 768 | 22.98% | 115 | 3.44% | 1,691 | 50.60% | 3,342 |
| Poinsett | 4,242 | 70.01% | 1,642 | 27.10% | 175 | 2.89% | 2,600 | 42.91% | 6,059 |
| Polk | 4,779 | 79.10% | 1,065 | 17.63% | 198 | 3.28% | 3,714 | 61.47% | 6,042 |
| Pope | 12,974 | 72.56% | 4,303 | 24.06% | 604 | 3.38% | 8,671 | 48.49% | 17,881 |
| Prairie | 2,005 | 70.72% | 771 | 27.20% | 59 | 2.08% | 1,234 | 43.53% | 2,835 |
| Pulaski | 51,853 | 39.25% | 75,548 | 57.19% | 4,707 | 3.56% | -23,695 | -17.94% | 132,108 |
| Randolph | 3,793 | 68.12% | 1,538 | 27.62% | 237 | 4.26% | 2,255 | 40.50% | 5,568 |
| Saline | 28,241 | 68.87% | 11,336 | 27.65% | 1,428 | 3.48% | 16,905 | 41.23% | 41,005 |
| Scott | 2,156 | 76.08% | 563 | 19.87% | 115 | 4.06% | 1,593 | 56.21% | 2,834 |
| Searcy | 2,396 | 77.07% | 590 | 18.98% | 123 | 3.96% | 1,806 | 58.09% | 3,109 |
| Sebastian | 21,857 | 66.23% | 9,809 | 29.72% | 1,338 | 4.05% | 12,048 | 36.50% | 33,004 |
| Sevier | 2,268 | 70.99% | 826 | 25.85% | 101 | 3.16% | 1,442 | 45.13% | 3,195 |
| Sharp | 4,163 | 73.53% | 1,328 | 23.45% | 171 | 3.02% | 2,835 | 50.07% | 5,662 |
| St. Francis | 2,454 | 42.19% | 3,218 | 55.32% | 145 | 2.49% | -764 | -13.13% | 5,817 |
| Stone | 3,123 | 71.55% | 1,095 | 25.09% | 147 | 3.37% | 2,028 | 46.46% | 4,365 |
| Union | 7,571 | 62.00% | 4,228 | 34.62% | 412 | 3.37% | 3,343 | 27.38% | 12,211 |
| Van Buren | 4,444 | 71.44% | 1,564 | 25.14% | 213 | 3.42% | 2,880 | 46.29% | 6,221 |
| Washington | 32,335 | 49.66% | 30,413 | 46.71% | 2,365 | 3.63% | 1,922 | 2.95% | 65,113 |
| White | 16,779 | 76.61% | 4,467 | 20.40% | 656 | 3.00% | 12,312 | 56.21% | 21,902 |
| Woodruff | 989 | 47.62% | 1,008 | 48.53% | 80 | 3.85% | -19 | -0.91% | 2,077 |
| Yell | 3,773 | 71.27% | 1,344 | 25.39% | 177 | 3.34% | 2,429 | 45.88% | 5,294 |
| Totals | 530,230 | 60.05% | 323,682 | 36.66% | 29,123 | 3.30% | 206,548 | 23.39% | 883,035 |

Counties that flipped from Democratic to Republican

- Clark (largest city: Arkadelphia)
- Mississippi (largest city: Blytheville)

== See also ==
- 2018 Arkansas elections
