= Arkansas's 4th congressional district =

U.S. House district for Arkansas

Coordinates: 34°13′11″N 93°12′16″W

- Interactive map of district boundaries since January 3, 2023
- Representative: Bruce Westerman; R–Hot Springs
- Area: 20,951 mi^{2} (54,260 km^{2})
- Distribution: 66.2% urban; 33.8% rural
- Population (2025): 744,780
- Median household income: $56,707
- Ethnicity: 66.8% White; 19.5% Black; 7.5% Hispanic; 4.4% Two or more races; 0.8% Asian; 0.6% Native American; 0.3% other
- Cook PVI: R+20

Arkansas's 4th congressional district is a congressional district located in the southwestern portion of the U.S. state of Arkansas. Notable towns in the district include Camden, Hope, Hot Springs, Magnolia, Pine Bluff, and Texarkana.

The district is currently represented by Republican Bruce Westerman.

Historically, the district has supported conservative Democrats such as Mike Ross and David Pryor, and was reckoned as a classic Yellow Dog Democrat district. However, the growing Republican trend in the state has overtaken the district since the start of the 21st century with the district supporting George W. Bush with 51% in 2004 and support grew as John McCain won the district in 2008 with 58% of the vote. It is the poorest congressional district in the state, with a median income of $49,018, per a 2024 study.

== Composition ==
The 4th congressional district consists of the entirety of the following counties, with the exception of Pulaski County, which it shares with the 1st and 2nd districts. Pulaski County municipalities within the 4th district include portions of Little Rock (shared with the 2nd district) and the entirety of Hensley, Landmark, Sweet Home, Woodson, and Wrightsville.

#	County	Seat	Population
3	Ashley	Hamburg	16,307
11	Bradley	Warren	10,104
13	Calhoun	Hampton	4,641
19	Clark	Arkadelphia	21,274
25	Cleveland	Rison	7,378
27	Columbia	Magnolia	22,150
39	Dallas	Fordyce	6,185
43	Drew	Monticello	16,945
47	Franklin	Ozark, Charleston	17,468
51	Garland	Hot Springs	99,784
53	Grant	Sheridan	18,383
57	Hempstead	Hope	19,343
59	Hot Spring	Malvern	33,258
61	Howard	Nashville	12,533
69	Jefferson	Pine Bluff	63,661
71	Johnson	Clarksville	26,129
73	Lafayette	Lewisville	6,095
81	Little River	Ashdown	11,805
83	Logan	Booneville, Paris	21,400
91	Miller	Texarkana	42,415
97	Montgomery	Mount Ida	8,620
99	Nevada	Prescott	8,120
101	Newton	Jasper	7,071
103	Ouachita	Camden	21,793
109	Pike	Murfreesboro	10,208
113	Polk	Mena	19,436
115	Pope	Russellville	64,593
119	Pulaski (shared 1st and 2nd)	Little Rock	400,009
127	Scott	Waldron	9,851
133	Sevier	De Queen	15,632
139	Union	El Dorado	37,397
149	Yell	Dardanelle, Danville	20,044

== Recent election results from statewide races ==
Year	Office	Results
2008	President	McCain 59% - 38%
2012	President	Romney 62% - 38%
2016	President	Trump 63% - 33%
2016	Senate	Boozman 61% - 36%
2018	Governor	Hutchinson 68% - 30%
2018	Lt. Governor	Griffin 67% - 31%
2018	Attorney General	Rutledge 64% - 33%
2020	President	Trump 66% - 31%
2022	Senate	Boozman 70% - 27%
2022	Governor	Huckabee Sanders 68% - 30%
2022	Lt. Governor	Rutledge 69% - 28%
2022	Attorney General	Griffin 72% - 28%
2022	Secretary of State	Thurston 71% - 29%
2022	Treasurer	Lowery 70% - 30%
2022	Auditor	Milligan 71% - 26%
2024	President	Trump 69% - 29%
2024	Treasurer (Spec.)	Thurston 70% - 26%
2026	Senate	Cotton 59% - 35%
2026	Governor	Huckabee Sanders 57% - 32%

== List of members representing the district ==
Member	Party	Years	Cong ress	Electoral history	Location
District created on March 4, 1875
Thomas M. Gunter (Fayetteville)	Democratic	March 4, 1875 – March 3, 1883	44th 45th 46th 47th	Redistricted from the 3rd district and re-elected in 1874. Re-elected in 1876. Re-elected in 1878. Re-elected in 1880. Retired.	
Samuel W. Peel (Bentonville)	Democratic	March 4, 1883 – March 3, 1885	48th	Elected in 1882. Redistricted to the 5th district.	
John Henry Rogers (Fort Smith)	Democratic	March 4, 1885 – March 3, 1891	49th 50th 51st	Redistricted from the 3rd district and re-elected in 1884. Re-elected in 1886. Re-elected in 1888. Retired.	
William L. Terry (Little Rock)	Democratic	March 4, 1891 – March 3, 1901	52nd 53rd 54th 55th 56th	Elected in 1890. Re-elected in 1892. Re-elected in 1894. Re-elected in 1896. Re-elected in 1898. Lost renomination.	
Charles C. Reid (Morrilton)	Democratic	March 4, 1901 – March 3, 1903	57th	Elected in 1900. Redistricted to the 5th district.	
John Sebastian Little (Greenwood)	Democratic	March 4, 1903 – January 14, 1907	58th 59th	Redistricted from the 2nd district and Re-elected in 1902. Re-elected in 1904. Resigned when elected Governor of Arkansas	
Vacant		January 14, 1907 – March 3, 1907	59th		
William B. Cravens (Fort Smith)	Democratic	March 4, 1907 – March 3, 1913	60th 61st 62nd	Elected in 1906. Re-elected in 1908. Re-elected in 1910. Retired.	
Otis Wingo (De Queen)	Democratic	March 4, 1913 – October 21, 1930	63rd 64th 65th 66th 67th 68th 69th 70th 71st	Elected in 1912. Re-elected in 1914. Re-elected in 1916. Re-elected in 1918. Re-elected in 1920. Re-elected in 1922. Re-elected in 1924. Re-elected in 1926. Re-elected in 1928. Died.	
Vacant		October 21, 1930 – November 4, 1930	71st		
Effiegene Locke Wingo (De Queen)	Democratic	November 4, 1930 – March 3, 1933	71st 72nd	Elected to finish her husband's term. Retired.	
William B. Cravens (Fort Smith)	Democratic	March 4, 1933 – January 13, 1939	73rd 74th 75th 76th	Elected in 1932. Re-elected in 1934. Re-elected in 1936. Died.	
Vacant		January 13, 1939 – September 12, 1939	76th		
William Fadjo Cravens (Fort Smith)	Democratic	September 12, 1939 – January 3, 1949	76th 77th 78th 79th 80th	Elected to finish his father's term. Re-elected in 1940. Re-elected in 1942. Re-elected in 1944. Re-elected in 1946. Retired.	
Boyd Anderson Tackett (Nashville)	Democratic	January 3, 1949 – January 3, 1953	81st 82nd	Elected in 1948. Re-elected in 1950. Retired to run for governor.	
Oren Harris (El Dorado)	Democratic	January 3, 1953 – February 2, 1966	83rd 84th 85th 86th 87th 88th 89th	Redistricted from the 7th district and re-elected in 1952. Re-elected in 1954. Re-elected in 1956. Re-elected in 1958. Re-elected in 1960. Re-elected in 1962. Re-elected in 1964. Re-elected in 1966. Resigned to become US District judge for the Eastern and Western District of Arkansas.	
Vacant		February 2, 1966 – November 8, 1966	89th		
David Pryor (Camden)	Democratic	November 8, 1966 – January 3, 1973	89th 90th 91st 92nd	Elected to finish Harris's term and begin own. Re-elected in 1968. Re-elected in 1970. Retired to run for U.S. senator.	
Ray Thornton (Sheridan)	Democratic	January 3, 1973 – January 3, 1979	93rd 94th 95th	Elected in 1972. Re-elected in 1974. Re-elected in 1976. Retired to run for U.S. Senator.	
Beryl Anthony Jr. (El Dorado)	Democratic	January 3, 1979 – January 3, 1993	96th 97th 98th 99th 100th 101st 102nd	Elected in 1978. Re-elected in 1980. Re-elected in 1982. Re-elected in 1984. Re-elected in 1986. Re-elected in 1988. Re-elected in 1990. Lost renomination.	
Jay Dickey (Pine Bluff)	Republican	January 3, 1993 – January 3, 2001	103rd 104th 105th 106th	Elected in 1992. Re-elected in 1994. Re-elected in 1996. Re-elected in 1998. Lost re-election.	1993–2003 [data missing]
Mike Ross (Prescott)	Democratic	January 3, 2001 – January 3, 2013	107th 108th 109th 110th 111th 112th	Elected in 2000. Re-elected in 2002. Re-elected in 2004. Re-elected in 2006. Re-elected in 2008. Re-elected in 2010. Retired to run for Governor of Arkansas.	1993–2003 [data missing]
Mike Ross (Prescott)	Democratic	January 3, 2001 – January 3, 2013	107th 108th 109th 110th 111th 112th	Elected in 2000. Re-elected in 2002. Re-elected in 2004. Re-elected in 2006. Re-elected in 2008. Re-elected in 2010. Retired to run for Governor of Arkansas.	2003–2013
Tom Cotton (Dardanelle)	Republican	January 3, 2013 – January 3, 2015	113th	Elected in 2012. Retired to run for U.S. Senator.	2013–2023
Bruce Westerman (Hot Springs)	Republican	January 3, 2015 – present	114th 115th 116th 117th 118th 119th	Elected in 2014. Re-elected in 2016. Re-elected in 2018. Re-elected in 2020. Re-elected in 2022; Re-elected in 2024. Re-elected in 2026.	2013–2023
Bruce Westerman (Hot Springs)	Republican	January 3, 2015 – present	114th 115th 116th 117th 118th 119th	Elected in 2014. Re-elected in 2016. Re-elected in 2018. Re-elected in 2020. Re-elected in 2022; Re-elected in 2024. Re-elected in 2026.	2023–present

== Recent US House election results ==
=== 2002 ===
Arkansas's 4th Congressional District House Election, 2002
Party	Candidate	Votes	%	±%
Democratic	Michael Avery Ross*	119,633	60.56%	
Republican	Jay Dickey	77,904	39.44%	
Majority		41,729	21.12%	
Total votes		197,537	100.00	
Democratic hold				

=== 2004 ===
Arkansas's 4th Congressional District House Election, 2004
Party	Candidate	Votes	%	±%
Democratic	Michael Avery Ross*	243,003	100.00%	
Majority		243,003	100.00%	
Total votes			100.00	
Democratic hold				

=== 2006 ===
Arkansas's 4th Congressional District House Election, 2006
Party	Candidate	Votes	%	±%
Democratic	Michael Avery Ross*	128,236	74.73%	
Republican	Joe Ross	43,360	25.27%	
Majority		84,876	49.46%	
Total votes		171,596	100.00	
Democratic hold				

=== 2008 ===
Arkansas's 4th Congressional District House Election, 2008
Party	Candidate	Votes	%	±%
Democratic	Michael Avery Ross*	203,178	86.17%	
Green	J. Joshua Drake	32,603	13.83%	
Majority		170,575	72.34%	
Total votes		235,781	100.00	
Democratic hold				

=== 2010 ===
Arkansas's 4th Congressional District House Election, 2010
Party	Candidate	Votes	%	±%
Democratic	Michael Avery Ross*	102,479	57.53%	
Republican	Beth Anne Rankin	71,526	40.15%	
Green	J. Joshua Drake	4,129	2.32%	
Majority		30,953	17.38%	
Total votes		178,134	100.00	
Democratic hold				

=== 2012 ===
Arkansas's 4th Congressional District House Election, 2012
Party	Candidate	Votes	%	±%
Republican	Tom Cotton	154,149	59.53%	
Democratic	Gene Jeffress	95,013	36.69%	
Libertarian	Bobby Tullis	4,984	1.92%	
Green	J. Joshua Drake	4,807	1.86%	
Majority		59,136	22.84%	
Total votes		258,953	100.00	
Republican gain from Democratic				

=== 2014 ===
Arkansas's 4th Congressional District House Election, 2014
Party	Candidate	Votes	%	±%
Republican	Bruce Westerman (incumbent)	110,789	54%	
Democratic	James Lee Witt	87,742	43%	
Libertarian	Ken Hamilton	7,598	3%	
Majority		23,047	11%	
Total votes		206,131	100.00%	
Republican hold				

=== 2016 ===
Arkansas's 4th Congressional District House Election, 2016
Party	Candidate	Votes	%	±%
Republican	Bruce Westerman (incumbent)	182,885	75%	
Libertarian	Ken Hamilton	61,274	25%	
Majority		121,611	50%	
Total votes		244,159	100.00%	
Republican hold				

=== 2018 ===
Arkansas's 4th Congressional District House Election, 2018
Party	Candidate	Votes	%
Republican	Bruce Westerman (incumbent)	136,740	66.74%
Democratic	Hayden Shamel	63,984	31.23%
Libertarian	Tom Canada	3,952	1.93%
Write-in		216	0.11%
Total votes		204,892	100%
Republican hold			

=== 2020 ===
Arkansas's 4th Congressional District House Election, 2020
Party	Candidate	Votes	%
Republican	Bruce Westerman (incumbent)	191,617	69.7
Democratic	William Hanson	75,750	27.5
Libertarian	Frank Gilbert	7,668	2.8
Total votes		275,035	100.0
Republican hold			

=== 2022 ===
Arkansas's 4th Congressional District House Election, 2022
Party	Candidate	Votes	%
Republican	Bruce Westerman (incumbent)	153,850	71.00
Democratic	John White	56,745	26.19
Libertarian	Gregory Maxwell	6,101	2.82
Total votes		216,696	100.0
Republican hold			

=== 2024 ===
Arkansas's 4th congressional district, 2024
Party	Candidate	Votes	%
Republican	Bruce Westerman (incumbent)	197,046	72.9
Democratic	Risie Howard	73,207	27.1
Total votes		270,253	100%
Republican hold			
