= 2018 Arkansas gubernatorial election =

- November 6, 2018
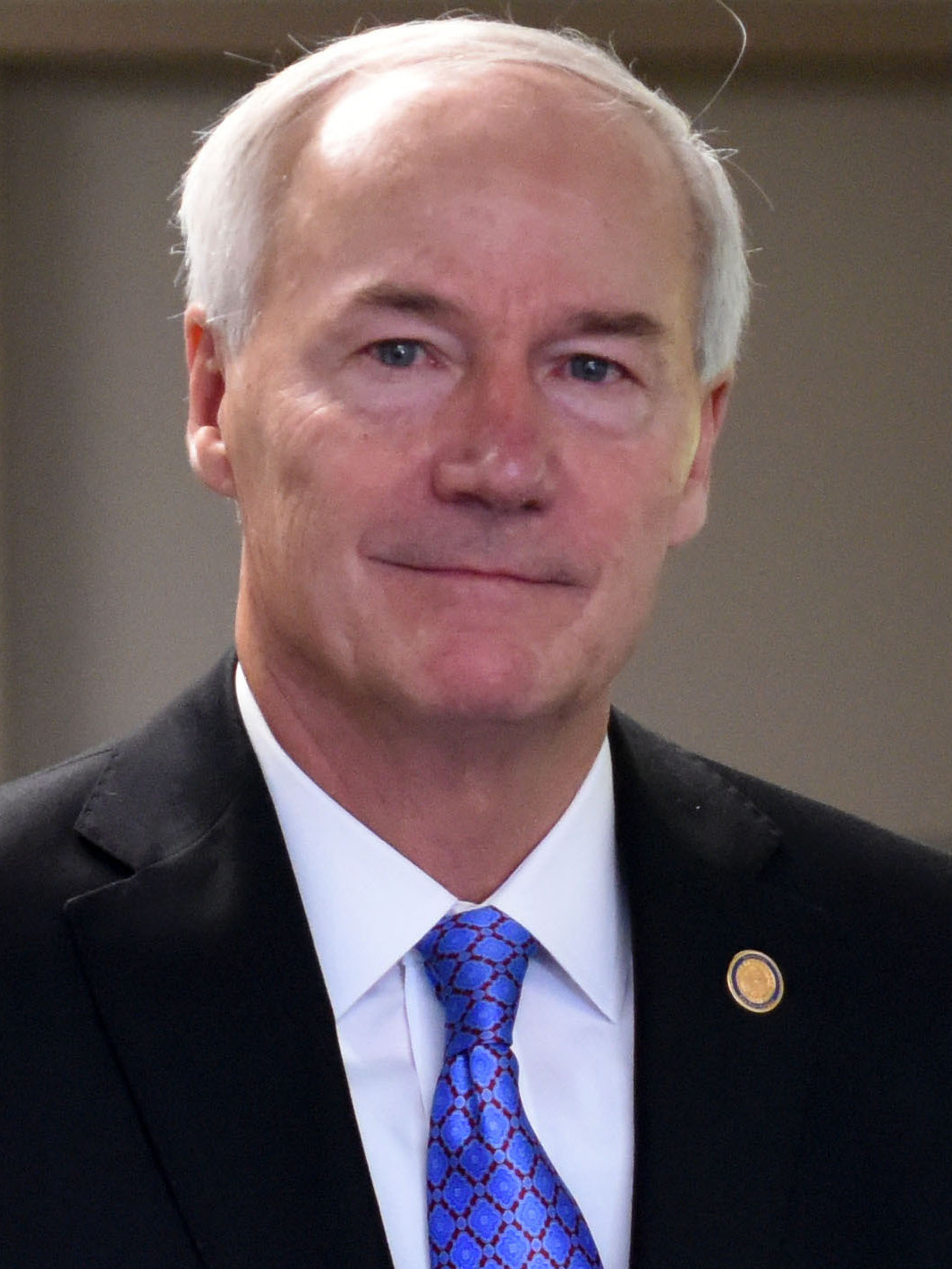

Nominee	Asa Hutchinson	Jared Henderson
Party	Republican	Democratic
Popular vote	582,406	283,218
Percentage	65.33%	31.77%
- Hutchinson: 40–50% 50–60% 60–70% 70–80% 80–90% >90% Henderson: 40–50% 50–60% 60–70% 70–80% 80–90% >90% Tie: 40–50% 50%
Governor before election
Asa Hutchinson
Republican
Elected Governor
Asa Hutchinson
Republican

The 2018 Arkansas gubernatorial election was held on November 6, 2018, to elect the governor of Arkansas, concurrently with elections to the United States Senate in other states, elections to the United States House of Representatives, and various state and local elections. Incumbent Republican governor Asa Hutchinson won re-election to a second term, winning by more than 33 percentage points and carrying all but seven counties, marking the largest winning margin of any Republican gubernatorial candidate in Arkansas history.

== Republican primary ==
=== Candidates ===
==== Declared ====
- Asa Hutchinson, incumbent governor
- Jan Morgan, gun range owner

==== Declined ====
- Tim Griffin, lieutenant governor and former U.S. representative (running for re-election)
- Leslie Rutledge, attorney general (running for re-election)
- John Thurston, land commissioner (running for Secretary of State)

=== Endorsements ===
Asa Hutchinson

Federal officials

- Donald Trump, 45th president of the United States

Organizations

- National Rifle Association of America

Newspapers

- Arkansas Democrat-Gazette

=== Polling ===
Poll source	Date(s) administered	Sample size	Margin of error	Asa Hutchinson	Jan Morgan	Undecided
Hendrix College	April 17–19, 2018	676	± 3.8%	58%	31%	12%

=== Results ===
Results by county: Hutchinson: 50–60%; 60–70%; 70–80%; 80–90%; Morgan: 50–60%

Republican primary results
Party	Candidate	Votes	%
Republican	Asa Hutchinson (incumbent)	145,251	69.7
Republican	Jan Morgan	63,009	30.3
Total votes		208,260	100.0

== Democratic primary ==
=== Candidates ===
==== Declared ====
- Jared Henderson, former Arkansas executive director of Teach For America
- Leticia Sanders, hairdresser

==== Declined ====
- Keith Ingram, Minority Leader of the Arkansas Senate
- Jay Martin, former Majority Leader of the Arkansas House of Representatives
- Kevin Smith, mayor of Helena-West Helena, Arkansas, former Majority Whip of the Arkansas Senate, former Democratic candidate in 1996 United States Senate election in Arkansas

=== Results ===
Results by county: Henderson: 50–60%; 60–70%; 70–80%; Sanders: 50–60%; 60–70%

Democratic primary results
Party	Candidate	Votes	%
Democratic	Jared Henderson	68,340	63.4
Democratic	Leticia Sanders	39,382	36.6
Total votes		107,722	100.0

== Independents ==
=== Candidates ===
==== Declined ====
- Bobby Bones, radio host

== Libertarian primary ==
=== Candidates ===
==== Declared ====
- Mark West (Libertarian), pastor and nominee for AR-01 in 2016

== General election ==
=== Predictions ===
Source	Ranking	As of
The Cook Political Report	Safe R	October 26, 2018
The Washington Post	Safe R	November 5, 2018
FiveThirtyEight	Safe R	November 5, 2018
Rothenberg Political Report	Safe R	November 1, 2018
Sabato's Crystal Ball	Safe R	November 5, 2018
RealClearPolitics	Safe R	November 4, 2018
Daily Kos	Safe R	November 5, 2018
Fox News (Note: The Fox News Midterm Power Rankings uniquely does not contain a category for Safe/Solid races)	Likely R	November 5, 2018
Politico	Safe R	November 5, 2018
Governing	Safe R	November 5, 2018

=== Debates ===
Dates	Location	Hutchinson	Henderson	West	Link
September 12, 2018	Little Rock, Arkansas	Didn't participate	Participant	Participant	Full debate - YouTube
October 12, 2018	Conway, Arkansas	Participant	Participant	Participant	Full debate - C-SPAN

=== Polling ===
Poll source	Date(s) administered	Sample size	Margin of error	Asa Hutchinson (R)	Jared Henderson (D)	Mark West (L)	Other	Undecided
University of Arkansas	October 1–28, 2018	618	± 3.9%	59%	35%	–	6%	–
Hendrix College	October 18–19, 2018	528	± 4.3%	60%	24%	5%	–	11%
Hendrix College	September 5–7, 2018	1,701	± 2.4%	60%	25%	6%	–	9%
Mason-Dixon	March 21–24, 2018	625	± 4.0%	63%	24%	–	–	13%

=== Results ===
2018 Arkansas gubernatorial election
Party	Candidate	Votes	%	±%
Republican	Asa Hutchinson (incumbent)	582,406	65.33%	+9.89%
Democratic	Jared Henderson	283,218	31.77%	–9.72%
Libertarian	Mark West	25,885	2.90%	+0.98%
Total votes		891,509	100.00%	N/A
Republican hold				

==== By county ====
County	Asa Hutchinson Republican		Jared Henderson Democratic		Mark West Libertarian		Margin		Total
County	#	%	#	%	#	%	#	%	Total
Arkansas	3,530	71.14%	1,355	27.31%	77	1.55%	2,175	43.83%	4,962
Ashley	4,278	69.50%	1,751	28.45%	126	2.05%	2,527	41.06%	6,155
Baxter	10,694	74.52%	2,978	20.75%	679	4.73%	7,716	53.77%	14,351
Benton	53,185	68.60%	22,316	28.78%	2,033	2.62%	30,869	39.81%	77,534
Boone	9,028	77.67%	2,208	19.00%	387	3.33%	6,820	58.68%	11,623
Bradley	1,906	66.78%	868	30.41%	80	2.80%	1,038	36.37%	2,854
Calhoun	1,335	74.54%	423	23.62%	33	1.84%	912	50.92%	1,791
Carroll	5,796	64.63%	2,968	33.10%	204	2.27%	2,828	31.53%	8,968
Chicot	1,638	46.13%	1,857	52.30%	56	1.58%	-219	-6.17%	3,551
Clark	3,988	59.25%	2,611	38.79%	132	1.96%	1,377	20.46%	6,731
Clay	3,218	77.88%	782	18.93%	132	3.19%	2,436	58.95%	4,132
Cleburne	7,856	81.63%	1,495	15.53%	273	2.84%	6,361	66.10%	9,624
Cleveland	2,020	78.02%	513	19.81%	56	2.16%	1,507	58.21%	2,589
Columbia	4,199	66.21%	2,044	32.23%	99	1.56%	2,155	33.98%	6,342
Conway	4,339	67.12%	1,966	30.41%	160	2.47%	2,373	36.71%	6,465
Craighead	17,313	66.39%	7,407	28.40%	1,358	5.21%	9,906	37.99%	26,078
Crawford	13,200	78.29%	3,120	18.51%	540	3.20%	10,080	59.79%	16,860
Crittenden	5,775	48.46%	5,833	48.94%	310	2.60%	-58	-0.49%	11,918
Cross	4,108	70.90%	1,498	25.85%	188	3.24%	2,610	45.05%	5,794
Dallas	1,316	62.22%	773	36.55%	26	1.23%	543	25.67%	2,115
Desha	1,833	52.84%	1,560	44.97%	76	2.19%	273	7.87%	3,469
Drew	3,658	67.78%	1,606	29.76%	133	2.46%	2,052	38.02%	5,397
Faulkner	25,643	66.50%	11,689	30.31%	1,227	3.18%	13,954	36.19%	38,559
Franklin	4,204	79.40%	916	17.30%	175	3.31%	3,288	62.10%	5,295
Fulton	2,829	73.83%	900	23.49%	103	2.69%	1,929	50.34%	3,832
Garland	21,969	69.16%	8,865	27.91%	933	2.94%	13,104	41.25%	31,767
Grant	4,524	81.53%	898	16.18%	127	2.29%	3,626	65.35%	5,549
Greene	8,275	75.55%	2,088	19.06%	590	5.39%	6,187	56.49%	10,953
Hempstead	3,312	66.63%	1,554	31.26%	105	2.11%	1,758	35.37%	4,971
Hot Spring	6,368	72.87%	2,113	24.18%	258	2.95%	4,255	48.69%	8,739
Howard	2,489	70.73%	974	27.68%	56	1.59%	1,515	43.05%	3,519
Independence	7,733	76.22%	1,928	19.00%	484	4.77%	5,805	57.22%	10,145
Izard	3,423	76.56%	869	19.44%	179	4.00%	2,554	57.12%	4,471
Jackson	2,998	71.88%	1,067	25.58%	106	2.54%	1,931	46.30%	4,171
Jefferson	9,005	45.43%	10,406	52.50%	409	2.06%	-1,401	-7.07%	19,820
Johnson	5,546	74.17%	1,672	22.36%	259	3.46%	3,874	51.81%	7,477
Lafayette	1,395	65.46%	693	32.52%	43	2.02%	702	32.94%	2,131
Lawrence	3,584	76.76%	908	19.45%	177	3.79%	2,676	57.31%	4,669
Lee	947	44.69%	1,130	53.33%	42	1.98%	-183	-8.64%	2,119
Lincoln	2,227	73.28%	771	25.37%	41	1.35%	1,456	47.91%	3,039
Little River	2,820	71.85%	1,014	25.83%	91	2.32%	1,806	46.01%	3,925
Logan	4,303	77.84%	1,041	18.83%	184	3.33%	3,262	59.01%	5,528
Lonoke	15,791	76.61%	4,171	20.23%	651	3.16%	11,620	56.37%	20,613
Madison	4,151	74.44%	1,283	23.01%	142	2.55%	2,868	51.43%	5,576
Marion	3,959	76.68%	1,027	19.89%	177	3.43%	2,932	56.79%	5,163
Miller	8,393	73.42%	2,841	24.85%	197	1.72%	5,552	48.57%	11,431
Mississippi	6,429	61.49%	3,660	35.01%	366	3.50%	2,769	26.48%	10,455
Monroe	1,493	56.55%	1,104	41.82%	43	1.63%	389	14.73%	2,640
Montgomery	2,204	77.85%	558	19.71%	69	2.44%	1,646	58.14%	2,831
Nevada	1,628	64.71%	842	33.47%	46	1.83%	786	31.24%	2,516
Newton	2,203	71.27%	695	22.48%	193	6.24%	1,508	48.79%	3,091
Ouachita	4,227	57.23%	3,031	41.04%	128	1.73%	1,196	16.19%	7,386
Perry	2,731	73.79%	838	22.64%	132	3.57%	1,893	51.15%	3,701
Phillips	2,401	44.10%	2,923	53.69%	120	2.20%	-522	-9.59%	5,444
Pike	2,708	80.64%	563	16.77%	87	2.59%	2,145	63.88%	3,358
Poinsett	4,690	76.77%	1,194	19.54%	225	3.68%	3,496	57.23%	6,109
Polk	4,903	80.96%	904	14.93%	249	4.11%	3,999	66.03%	6,056
Pope	13,437	74.83%	3,756	20.92%	763	4.25%	9,681	53.92%	17,956
Prairie	2,256	78.88%	560	19.58%	44	1.54%	1,696	59.30%	2,860
Pulaski	62,510	46.42%	69,265	51.43%	2,892	2.15%	-6,755	-5.02%	134,667
Randolph	4,285	75.68%	1,063	18.77%	314	5.55%	3,222	56.91%	5,662
Saline	30,756	73.97%	9,676	23.27%	1,146	2.76%	21,080	50.70%	41,578
Scott	2,331	80.97%	390	13.55%	158	5.49%	1,941	67.42%	2,879
Searcy	2,512	78.65%	524	16.41%	158	4.95%	1,988	62.24%	3,194
Sebastian	23,785	71.72%	8,316	25.07%	1,064	3.21%	15,469	46.64%	33,165
Sevier	2,412	75.33%	682	21.30%	108	3.37%	1,730	54.03%	3,202
Sharp	4,430	78.13%	1,038	18.31%	202	3.56%	3,392	59.82%	5,670
St. Francis	2,660	45.78%	3,019	51.95%	132	2.27%	-359	-6.18%	5,811
Stone	3,302	74.34%	956	21.52%	184	4.14%	2,346	52.81%	4,442
Union	8,225	65.79%	4,036	32.28%	241	1.93%	4,189	33.51%	12,502
Van Buren	4,937	78.41%	1,157	18.38%	202	3.21%	3,780	60.04%	6,296
Washington	35,967	54.61%	28,051	42.59%	1,845	2.80%	7,916	12.02%	65,863
White	17,610	80.07%	3,799	17.27%	584	2.66%	13,811	62.80%	21,993
Woodruff	1,271	60.93%	760	36.43%	55	2.64%	511	24.50%	2,086
Yell	4,002	75.07%	1,108	20.78%	221	4.15%	2,894	54.29%	5,331
Totals	582,406	65.33%	283,218	31.77%	25,885	2.90%	299,188	33.56%	891,509

==== Counties that flipped from Democratic to Republican ====
- Ashley (largest city: Crossett)
- Bradley (largest city: Warren)
- Clark (largest city: Arkadelphia)
- Dallas (largest city: Fordyce)
- Desha (largest city: Dumas)
- Drew (largest city: Monticello)
- Howard (largest city: Nashville)
- Jackson (largest city: Newport)
- Lafayette (largest city: Stamps)
- Lincoln (largest city: Star City)
- Little River (largest city: Ashdown)
- Mississippi (largest city: Blytheville)
- Monroe (largest city: Brinkley)
- Nevada (largest city: Prescott)
- Ouachita (largest city: Camden)
- Woodruff (largest city: Augusta)

==== By congressional district ====
Hutchinson won all four congressional districts.

District	Hutchinson	Henderson	Representative
1st	69%	27%	Rick Crawford
2nd	59%	39%	French Hill
3rd	66%	31%	Steve Womack
4th	69%	28%	Bruce Westerman

== See also ==
- 2018 Arkansas elections
