= 2024 Arkansas State Treasurer special election =

- November 5, 2024
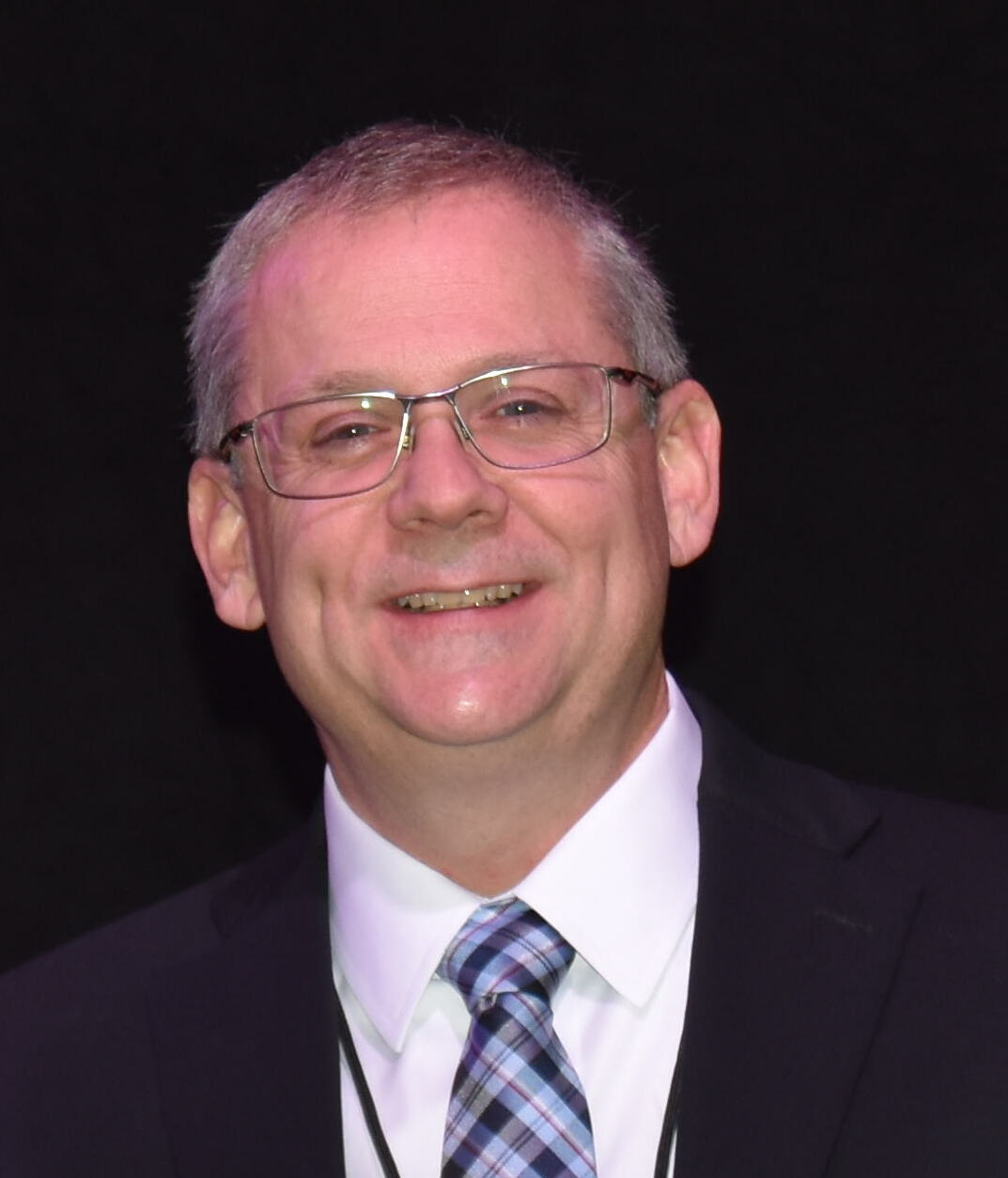

Nominee	John Thurston	John Pagan
Party	Republican	Democratic
Popular vote	755,156	350,210
Percentage	65.37%	30.32%
- Thurston: 40–50% 50–60% 60–70% 70–80% 80–90% Pagan: 50–60% Tie: 40–50%
State Treasurer before election
Larry Walther
Republican
Elected State Treasurer
John Thurston
Republican

The 2024 Arkansas State Treasurer special election took place on November 5, 2024, to elect the next treasurer of Arkansas. Incumbent Republican treasurer Larry Walther was appointed by Governor Sarah Huckabee Sanders on August 3, 2023, after the death of Mark Lowery. As an appointee, Walther cannot seek a full term, per the state constitution. Republican nominee John Thurston defeated Democrat John Pagan in the general election.

== Republican primary ==
=== Candidates ===
==== Nominee ====
- John Thurston, Arkansas Secretary of State (2019–2025)

=== Results ===
Republican primary results
Party	Candidate	Votes	%
Republican	John Thurston	Unopposed	
Total votes		—N/a	100.0

== Democratic primary ==
=== Candidates ===
==== Nominee ====
- John Pagan, former state senator

=== Results ===
Democratic primary results
Party	Candidate	Votes	%
Democratic	John Pagan	Unopposed	
Total votes		—N/a	100.0

== Libertarian Party ==
=== Candidates ===
==== Nominee ====
- Michael Pakko, Chief Economist at University of Arkansas at Little Rock's Arkansas Economic Development Institute

== General election ==
=== Results ===
2024 Arkansas State Treasurer special election
Party	Candidate	Votes	%	±%
Republican	John Thurston	755,156	65.37%	–0.90
Democratic	John Pagan	350,210	30.32%	–3.41
Libertarian	Michael Pakko	49,847	4.31%	N/A
Total votes		1,155,213	100.00%	N/A
Republican hold				

==== By county ====
County	John Thurston Republican		John Pagan Democratic		Michael Pakko Libertarian		Margin		Total
County	#	%	#	%	#	%	#	%	Total
Arkansas	3,955	72.49%	1,342	24.60%	159	2.91%	2,613	47.89%	5,456
Ashley	5,143	74.80%	1,605	23.34%	128	1.86%	3,538	51.45%	6,876
Baxter	15,915	77.84%	3,818	18.67%	712	3.48%	12,097	59.17%	20,445
Benton	81,745	64.88%	38,076	30.22%	6,170	4.90%	43,669	34.66%	125,991
Boone	13,461	80.85%	2,528	15.18%	660	3.96%	10,933	65.67%	16,649
Bradley	2,213	70.14%	873	27.67%	69	2.19%	1,340	42.47%	3,155
Calhoun	1,651	80.22%	331	16.08%	76	3.69%	1,320	64.14%	2,058
Carroll	7,389	65.47%	3,435	30.44%	462	4.09%	3,954	35.03%	11,286
Chicot	1,708	49.38%	1,704	49.26%	47	1.36%	4	0.12%	3,459
Clark	4,600	61.09%	2,629	34.91%	301	4.00%	1,971	26.18%	7,530
Clay	3,820	80.39%	815	17.15%	117	2.46%	3,005	63.24%	4,752
Cleburne	10,464	83.33%	1,722	13.71%	371	2.95%	8,742	69.62%	12,557
Cleveland	2,772	83.87%	449	13.59%	84	2.54%	2,323	70.29%	3,305
Columbia	5,266	68.23%	2,225	28.83%	227	2.94%	3,041	39.40%	7,718
Conway	5,924	70.39%	2,222	26.40%	270	3.21%	3,702	43.99%	8,416
Craighead	25,370	69.59%	10,029	27.51%	1,056	2.90%	15,341	42.08%	36,455
Crawford	17,812	77.65%	4,287	18.69%	839	3.66%	13,525	58.96%	22,938
Crittenden	7,152	49.93%	6,802	47.48%	371	2.59%	350	2.44%	14,325
Cross	4,732	74.01%	1,512	23.65%	150	2.35%	3,220	50.36%	6,394
Dallas	1,469	64.83%	738	32.57%	59	2.60%	731	32.26%	2,266
Desha	1,841	54.37%	1,498	44.24%	47	1.39%	343	10.13%	3,386
Drew	4,202	67.11%	1,886	30.12%	173	2.76%	2,316	36.99%	6,261
Faulkner	35,014	65.40%	15,505	28.96%	3,019	5.64%	19,509	36.44%	53,538
Franklin	5,447	79.99%	1,067	15.67%	296	4.35%	4,380	64.32%	6,810
Fulton	3,866	78.85%	880	17.95%	157	3.20%	2,986	60.90%	4,903
Garland	27,572	67.66%	11,166	27.40%	2,012	4.94%	16,406	40.26%	40,750
Grant	6,587	82.72%	1,049	13.17%	327	4.11%	5,538	69.55%	7,963
Greene	12,211	79.43%	2,632	17.12%	531	3.45%	9,579	62.31%	15,374
Hempstead	4,106	69.56%	1,608	27.24%	189	3.20%	2,498	42.32%	5,903
Hot Spring	9,158	75.80%	2,506	20.74%	417	3.45%	6,652	55.06%	12,081
Howard	3,228	74.10%	1,019	23.39%	109	2.50%	2,209	50.71%	4,356
Independence	10,805	78.91%	2,537	18.53%	350	2.56%	8,268	60.39%	13,692
Izard	4,766	82.41%	810	14.01%	207	3.58%	3,956	68.41%	5,783
Jackson	3,492	74.41%	1,084	23.10%	117	2.49%	2,408	51.31%	4,693
Jefferson	8,924	42.57%	11,266	53.75%	771	3.68%	-2,342	-11.17%	20,961
Johnson	6,627	74.92%	1,836	20.76%	383	4.33%	4,791	54.16%	8,846
Lafayette	1,578	70.04%	625	27.74%	50	2.22%	953	42.30%	2,253
Lawrence	4,568	81.91%	833	14.94%	176	3.16%	3,735	66.97%	5,577
Lee	1,191	48.75%	1,191	48.75%	61	2.50%	0	0.00%	2,443
Lincoln	2,476	74.60%	759	22.87%	84	2.53%	1,717	51.73%	3,319
Little River	3,678	76.96%	970	20.30%	131	2.74%	2,708	56.66%	4,779
Logan	6,420	79.52%	1,303	16.14%	350	4.34%	5,117	63.38%	8,073
Lonoke	22,921	76.16%	5,786	19.22%	1,390	4.62%	17,135	56.93%	30,097
Madison	5,732	78.27%	1,352	18.46%	239	3.26%	4,380	59.81%	7,323
Marion	6,078	79.41%	1,290	16.85%	286	3.74%	4,788	62.56%	7,654
Miller	11,544	74.77%	3,440	22.28%	456	2.95%	8,104	52.49%	15,440
Mississippi	6,920	66.96%	3,119	30.18%	296	2.86%	3,801	36.78%	10,335
Monroe	1,405	59.03%	919	38.61%	56	2.35%	486	20.42%	2,380
Montgomery	2,891	79.95%	600	16.59%	125	3.46%	2,291	63.36%	3,616
Nevada	2,004	70.34%	757	26.57%	88	3.09%	1,247	43.77%	2,849
Newton	2,900	80.00%	609	16.80%	116	3.20%	2,291	63.20%	3,625
Ouachita	5,098	60.28%	3,137	37.09%	222	2.63%	1,961	23.19%	8,457
Perry	3,463	77.28%	825	18.41%	193	4.31%	2,638	58.87%	4,481
Phillips	2,219	46.85%	2,427	51.25%	90	1.90%	-208	-4.39%	4,736
Pike	3,655	85.22%	514	11.98%	120	2.80%	3,141	73.23%	4,289
Poinsett	5,618	81.44%	1,097	15.90%	183	2.65%	4,521	65.54%	6,898
Polk	6,710	83.02%	1,005	12.44%	367	4.54%	5,705	70.59%	8,082
Pope	17,768	74.88%	4,731	19.94%	1,229	5.18%	13,037	54.94%	23,728
Prairie	2,588	82.76%	467	14.93%	72	2.30%	2,121	67.83%	3,127
Pulaski	59,596	39.70%	81,421	54.24%	9,086	6.05%	-21,825	-14.54%	150,103
Randolph	5,203	80.97%	1,009	15.70%	214	3.33%	4,194	65.27%	6,426
Saline	39,132	69.11%	14,376	25.39%	3,112	5.50%	24,756	43.72%	56,620
Scott	2,805	85.18%	374	11.36%	114	3.46%	2,431	73.82%	3,293
Searcy	3,181	83.93%	489	12.90%	120	3.17%	2,692	71.03%	3,790
Sebastian	30,335	68.22%	11,941	26.85%	2,192	4.93%	18,394	41.36%	44,468
Sevier	3,657	79.52%	805	17.50%	137	2.98%	2,852	62.01%	4,599
Sharp	5,825	80.12%	1,192	16.40%	253	3.48%	4,633	63.73%	7,270
St. Francis	2,910	49.90%	2,801	48.03%	121	2.07%	109	1.87%	5,832
Stone	4,602	78.68%	1,017	17.39%	230	3.93%	3,585	61.29%	5,849
Union	10,201	67.45%	4,482	29.64%	440	2.91%	5,719	37.82%	15,123
Van Buren	5,841	78.47%	1,318	17.71%	285	3.83%	4,523	60.76%	7,444
Washington	51,529	54.29%	39,066	41.16%	4,316	4.55%	12,463	13.13%	94,911
White	23,938	79.81%	4,903	16.35%	1,154	3.85%	19,035	63.46%	29,995
Woodruff	1,520	67.02%	698	30.78%	50	2.20%	822	36.24%	2,268
Yell	5,049	79.76%	1,071	16.92%	210	3.32%	3,978	62.84%	6,330
Totals	755,156	65.37%	350,210	30.32%	49,847	4.31%	404,946	35.05%	1,155,213

Counties that flipped from Democratic to Republican

- Chicot (largest city: Dermott)

Counties that flipped from Democratic to Tied

- Lee (largest city: Marianna)

==== By congressional district ====
Thurston won all four congressional districts.

District	Thurston	Pagan	Representative
1st	72%	24%	Rick Crawford
2nd	58%	37%	French Hill
3rd	63%	32%	Steve Womack
4th	70%	26%	Bruce Westerman
