= Arkansas's 2nd congressional district =

U.S. House district for Arkansas

Coordinates: 35°05′58″N 92°22′46″W

- Interactive map of district boundaries since January 3, 2023
- Representative: French Hill; R–Little Rock
- Area: 6,045 mi^{2} (15,660 km^{2})
- Distribution: 66.2% urban; 33.8% rural
- Population (2025): 782,172
- Median household income: $70,701
- Ethnicity: 66.3% White; 20.2% Black; 6.2% Hispanic; 4.8% Two or more races; 1.8% Asian; 0.8% other
- Cook PVI: R+8

Arkansas's 2nd congressional district is a congressional district located in the central part of the U.S. state of Arkansas and includes most of the state capital of Little Rock, its suburbs, and surrounding areas. The district leans Republican, with a Cook Partisan Voting Index rating of R+8. However, due to the influence of heavily Democratic Little Rock, it is still considered the least Republican congressional district in Arkansas, which has an all-Republican congressional delegation.

It is represented in the United States House of Representatives by Republican French Hill who has represented the district since January 2015.

The district has been based on the state capital Little Rock since the 1960 United States census.

== Composition ==
The 2nd congressional district consists of the entirety of the following counties, with the exception of Pulaski County, which it shares with the 1st and 4th districts. Pulaski County municipalities within the 2nd district include portions of Little Rock (shared with the 4th district), portions of North Little Rock (shared with the 1st district), and the entirety of Cammack Village, College Station, Gibson, Jacksonville, Maumelle, Sherwood, and Roland.

#	County	Seat	Population
23	Cleburne	Heber Springs	25,445
29	Conway	Morrilton	21,077
45	Faulkner	Conway	129,951
105	Perry	Perryville	10,184
119	Pulaski (shared with 1st and 4th)	Little Rock	400,009
125	Saline	Benton	129,574
141	Van Buren	Clinton	16,142
145	White	Searcy	78,452

== Recent election results from statewide races ==
Year	Office	Results
2008	President	McCain 56% - 42%
2012	President	Romney 58% - 42%
2016	President	Trump 55% - 39%
2016	Senate	Boozman 53% - 43%
2018	Governor	Hutchinson 61% - 37%
2018	Lt. Governor	Griffin 60% - 37%
2018	Attorney General	Rutledge 56% - 41%
2020	President	Trump 55% - 42%
2022	Senate	Boozman 59% - 38%
2022	Governor	Huckabee Sanders 56% - 43%
2022	Lt. Governor	Rutledge 57% - 39%
2022	Attorney General	Griffin 62% - 38%
2022	Secretary of State	Thurston 61% - 39%
2022	Treasurer	Lowery 59% - 41%
2022	Auditor	Milligan 61% - 34%
2024	President	Trump 57% - 41%
2024	Treasurer (Spec.)	Thurston 58% - 37%
2026	Senate	Shoffner 49% - 47%
2026	Governor	Huckabee Sanders 48% - 44%

== List of members representing the district ==
Member	Party	Year	Cong ress	Electoral history	Location
District created March 4, 1853
Edward A. Warren (Camden)	Democratic	March 4, 1853 – March 3, 1855	33rd	Elected in 1853. Retired.	
Albert Rust (El Dorado)	Democratic	March 4, 1855 – March 3, 1857	34th	Elected in 1854. Lost renomination.	
Edward A. Warren (Camden)	Democratic	March 4, 1857 – March 3, 1859	35th	Elected in 1856. Retired.	
Albert Rust (Little Rock)	Democratic	March 4, 1859 – March 3, 1861	36th		
Vacant		March 4, 1861 – June 22, 1868	37th 38th 39th 40th	Civil War and Reconstruction	
James M. Hinds (Little Rock)	Republican	June 22, 1868 – October 22, 1868	40th	Elected in 1868 to finish term. Assassinated.	
Vacant		October 22, 1868 – January 13, 1869	40th		
James T. Elliott (Camden)	Republican	January 13, 1869 – March 3, 1869	40th	Elected on an unknown date to finish Hinds's term. Seated January 13, 1869. Retired.	
Anthony A. C. Rogers (Pine Bluff)	Democratic	March 4, 1869 – March 3, 1871	41st	Elected in 1868. Lost re-election.	
Oliver P. Snyder (Pine Bluff)	Republican	March 4, 1871 – March 3, 1875	42nd 43rd	Elected in 1870. Re-elected in 1872. Lost renomination.	
William F. Slemons (Monticello)	Democratic	March 4, 1875 – March 3, 1881	44th 45th 46th	Elected in 1874. Re-elected in 1876. Re-elected in 1878. Retired.	
James Kimbrough Jones (Washington)	Democratic	March 4, 1881 – February 19, 1885	47th 48th	Elected in 1880. Re-elected in 1882. Resigned when elected U.S. Senator.	
Vacant		February 19, 1885 – March 3, 1885	48th		
Clifton R. Breckinridge (Pine Bluff)	Democratic	March 4, 1885 – September 5, 1890	49th 50th 51st	Redistricted from the at-large district and re-elected in 1884. Re-elected in 1886. Lost contested election.	
Vacant		September 5, 1890 – November 4, 1890	51st		
Clifton R. Breckinridge (Pine Bluff)	Democratic	November 4, 1890 – August 14, 1894	51st 52nd 53rd	Elected after John M. Clayton was assassinated while 1888 contest was pending. Re-elected in 1890. Re-elected in 1892. Resigned to become U.S. Minister to Russia.	
Vacant		August 14, 1894 – December 3, 1894	53rd		
John Sebastian Little (Greenwood)	Democratic	December 3, 1894 – March 3, 1903	53rd 54th 55th 56th 57th	Elected to finish Breckinridge's term. Re-elected in 1894. Re-elected in 1896. Re-elected in 1898. Re-elected in 1900. Redistricted to the 4th district.	
Stephen Brundidge Jr. (Searcy)	Democratic	March 4, 1903 – March 3, 1909	58th 59th 60th	Redistricted from the 6th district and re-elected in 1902. Re-elected in 1904. Re-elected in 1906. Retired to run for governor.	
William Allan Oldfield (Batesville)	Democratic	March 4, 1909 – November 19, 1928	61st 62nd 63rd 64th 65th 66th 67th 68th 69th 70th	Elected in 1908. Re-elected in 1910. Re-elected in 1912. Re-elected in 1914. Re-elected in 1916. Re-elected in 1918. Re-elected in 1920. Re-elected in 1922. Re-elected in 1924. Re-elected in 1926. Re-elected in 1928. Died.	
Vacant		November 19, 1928 – January 9, 1929	70th		
Pearl Peden Oldfield (Batesville)	Democratic	January 9, 1929 – March 3, 1931	70th 71st	Elected to finish her husband's term. Retired.	
John E. Miller (Searcy)	Democratic	March 4, 1931 – November 14, 1937	72nd 73rd 74th 75th	Elected in 1930. Re-elected in 1932. Re-elected in 1934. Re-elected in 1936. Resigned when elected U.S. Senator.	
Vacant		November 14, 1937 – January 3, 1939	75th		
Wilbur Mills (Kensett)	Democratic	January 3, 1939 – January 3, 1977	76th 77th 78th 79th 80th 81st 82nd 83rd 84th 85th 86th 87th 88th 89th 90th 91st 92nd 93rd 94th	Elected in 1938. Re-elected in 1940. Re-elected in 1942. Re-elected in 1944. Re-elected in 1946. Re-elected in 1948. Re-elected in 1950. Re-elected in 1952. Re-elected in 1954. Re-elected in 1956. Re-elected in 1958. Re-elected in 1960. Re-elected in 1962. Re-elected in 1964. Re-elected in 1966. Re-elected in 1968. Re-elected in 1970. Re-elected in 1972. Re-elected in 1974. Retired.	
Jim Guy Tucker (Little Rock)	Democratic	January 3, 1977 – January 3, 1979	95th	Elected in 1976. Retired to run for U.S. Senator.	
Ed Bethune (Searcy)	Republican	January 3, 1979 – January 3, 1985	96th 97th 98th	Re-elected in 1978. Re-elected in 1980. Re-elected in 1982. Retired to run for the U.S. Senate.	
Tommy F. Robinson (Jacksonville)	Democratic	January 3, 1985 – July 28, 1989	99th 100th 101st	Re-elected in 1984. Re-elected in 1986. Re-elected in 1988. Changed parties. Retired to run for Governor of Arkansas.	
Tommy F. Robinson (Jacksonville)	Republican	July 28, 1989 – January 3, 1991	99th 100th 101st	Re-elected in 1984. Re-elected in 1986. Re-elected in 1988. Changed parties. Retired to run for Governor of Arkansas.	
Ray Thornton (Little Rock)	Democratic	January 3, 1991 – January 1, 1997	102nd 103rd 104th	Elected in 1990. Re-elected in 1992. Re-elected in 1994. Resigned to become Associate justice of the Arkansas Supreme Court.	
Ray Thornton (Little Rock)	Democratic	January 3, 1991 – January 1, 1997	102nd 103rd 104th	Elected in 1990. Re-elected in 1992. Re-elected in 1994. Resigned to become Associate justice of the Arkansas Supreme Court.	1993–2003 [data missing]
Vacant		January 1, 1997 – January 3, 1997	104th		1993–2003 [data missing]
Vic Snyder (Little Rock)	Democratic	January 3, 1997 – January 3, 2011	105th 106th 107th 108th 109th 110th 111th	Elected in 1996. Re-elected in 1998. Re-elected in 2000. Re-elected in 2002. Re-elected in 2004. Re-elected in 2006. Re-elected in 2008. Retired.	1993–2003 [data missing]
Vic Snyder (Little Rock)	Democratic	January 3, 1997 – January 3, 2011	105th 106th 107th 108th 109th 110th 111th	Elected in 1996. Re-elected in 1998. Re-elected in 2000. Re-elected in 2002. Re-elected in 2004. Re-elected in 2006. Re-elected in 2008. Retired.	2003–2013
Tim Griffin (Little Rock)	Republican	January 3, 2011 – January 3, 2015	112th 113th	Elected in 2010. Re-elected in 2012. Retired to run for Lieutenant Governor of Arkansas.	2003–2013
Tim Griffin (Little Rock)	Republican	January 3, 2011 – January 3, 2015	112th 113th	Elected in 2010. Re-elected in 2012. Retired to run for Lieutenant Governor of Arkansas.	2013–2023
French Hill (Little Rock)	Republican	January 3, 2015 – present	114th 115th 116th 117th 118th 119th	Elected in 2014. Re-elected in 2016. Re-elected in 2018. Re-elected in 2020. Re-elected in 2022; Re-elected in 2024. Re-elected in 2026.	2013–2023
French Hill (Little Rock)	Republican	January 3, 2015 – present	114th 115th 116th 117th 118th 119th	Elected in 2014. Re-elected in 2016. Re-elected in 2018. Re-elected in 2020. Re-elected in 2022; Re-elected in 2024. Re-elected in 2026.	2023–present

== Recent election results ==
=== 2002 ===
Arkansas's 2nd Congressional District House Election, 2002
Party	Candidate	Votes	%	±%
Democratic	Vic Snyder*	142,752	92.92%	+35.38%
Write-In	Ed Garner	10,874	7.08%	+7.08%
Majority		131,878	85.84%	
Total votes		153,626	100.00%	
Democratic hold				

=== 2004 ===
Arkansas's 2nd Congressional District House Election, 2004
Party	Candidate	Votes	%	±%
Democratic	Vic Snyder*	160,834	58.17%	−34.92%
Republican	Marvin Parks	115,655	41.83%	+41.83%
Majority		45,179	16.34%	
Total votes		276,493	100.00%	
Democratic hold				

=== 2006 ===
Arkansas's 2nd Congressional District House Election, 2006
Party	Candidate	Votes	%	±%
Democratic	Vic Snyder*	124,871	60.53%	
Republican	Andy Mayberry	81,432	39.47%	+2.54%
Majority		43,439	21.06%	−2.54%
Total votes		206,303	100.00%	
Democratic hold				

=== 2008 ===
Arkansas's 2nd Congressional District House Election, 2008
Party	Candidate	Votes	%	±%
Democratic	Vic Snyder*	212,303	76.54%	+16.00%
Green	Deb McFarland	64,398	23.22%	+23.22%
Write-In	Danial Suits	665	0.24%	+0.24%
Majority		147,905	53.32%	
Total votes		277,366	100.00%	
Democratic hold				

=== 2010 ===
Arkansas's 2nd Congressional District House Election, 2010
Party	Candidate	Votes	%	±%
Republican	Tim Griffin	122,091	57.90%	+57.60%
Democratic	Joyce Elliott	80,687	38.27%	−38.27%
Independent	Lance Levi	4,421	2.10%	+2.10%
Green	Lewis Kennedy	3,599	1.71%	−21.51%
Write-In	Write-ins	54	0.03%	−0.21%
Majority		41,404	19.63%	
Total votes		210,852	100.00%	
Republican gain from Democratic				

=== 2012 ===
Arkansas's 2nd Congressional District House Election, 2012
Party	Candidate	Votes	%	±%
Republican	Tim Griffin*	158,175	55.19%	−2.71%
Democratic	Herb Rule	113,156	39.48%	+1.21%
Green	Barbara Ward	8,566	2.99%	+1.28%
Libertarian	Chris Hayes	6,701	2.34%	+2.34%
Majority		45,019	15.71%	
Total votes		286,598	100.00%	
Republican hold				

=== 2014 ===
Arkansas's 2nd Congressional District House Election, 2014
Party	Candidate	Votes	%	±%
Republican	French Hill	123,073	51.86%	−3.33%
Democratic	Pat Hays	103,477	43.64%	+4.16%
Libertarian	Debbie Standiford	10,590	4.50%	+2.16%
Majority		19,596	8.22%	
Total votes		237,140	100.00%	
Republican hold				

=== 2016 ===
Arkansas's 2nd Congressional District House Election, 2016
Party	Candidate	Votes	%	±%
Republican	French Hill*	176,472	58.34%	+7.00%
Democratic	Dianne Curry	111,347	36.81%	−6.83%
Libertarian	Chris Hayes	14,342	4.74%	+0.24%
Write-In	Write-ins	303	0.10%	+0.10%
Majority		65,125	21.53%	
Total votes		302,464	100.00%	
Republican hold				

=== 2018 ===
The 2018 election was held on November 6, 2018.

Arkansas' 2nd congressional district, 2018
Party	Candidate	Votes	%
Republican	French Hill (incumbent)	132,125	52.13
Democratic	Clarke Tucker	116,135	45.82
Libertarian	Joe Swafford	5,193	2.05
Total votes		253,453	100.0
Republican hold			

=== 2020 ===
Arkansas's 2nd Congressional District House Election, 2020
Party	Candidate	Votes	%
Republican	French Hill (incumbent)	184,093	55.37
Democratic	Joyce Elliott	148,410	44.63
Total votes		332,503	100.0
Republican hold			

=== 2022 ===
Arkansas's 2nd Congressional District House Election, 2022
Party	Candidate	Votes	%
Republican	French Hill (incumbent)	147,975	60.04
Democratic	Quintessa Hathaway	86,887	35.26
Libertarian	Michael White	11,584	4.70
Total votes		246,446	100.0
Republican hold			

=== 2024 ===
Arkansas's 2nd congressional district, 2024
Party	Candidate	Votes	%
Republican	French Hill (incumbent)	180,509	58.9
Democratic	Marcus Jones	125,777	41.1
Total votes		306,286	100
Republican hold			
