= 2022 Arkansas Secretary of State election =

- November 8, 2022
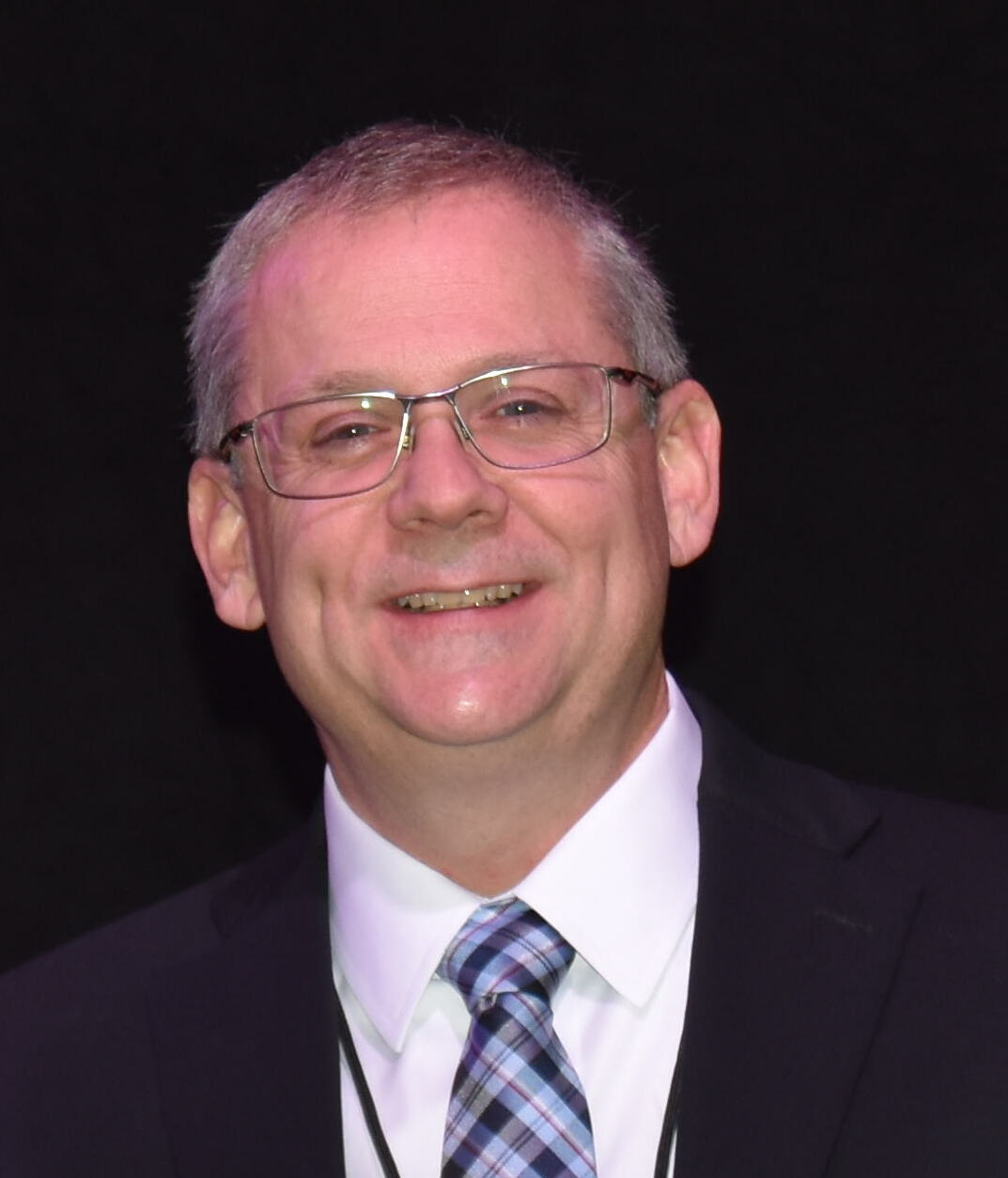

Candidate	John Thurston	Anna Beth Gorman
Party	Republican	Democratic
Popular vote	597,806	292,488
Percentage	67.05%	32.95%
- Thurston: 50–60% 60–70% 70–80% 80–90% Gorman: 50–60%
Secretary of State before election
John Thurston
Republican
Elected Secretary of State
John Thurston
Republican

The 2022 Arkansas Secretary of State election took place on November 8, 2022, to elect the Secretary of State of Arkansas. Incumbent Republican John Thurston won re-election to a second term.

== Republican primary ==
=== Candidates ===
Republican primary results by county Thurston: 50–60% 60–70% 70–80% 80–90%; Williams: 50–60%

==== Declared ====
- John Thurston, incumbent secretary of state (since 2018)

===== Eliminated in primary =====
- Eddie Joe Williams, former member of the Arkansas Senate (2011–2017)

==== Withdrew ====
- Mark Lowery, member of the Arkansas House of Representatives from the 39th district (since 2013) (running for state treasurer)

=== Polling ===
Poll source	Date(s) administered	Sample size (Note: Key: A – all adults RV – registered voters LV – likely voters V – unclear)	Margin of error	John Thurston	Eddie Joe Williams	Undecided
Hendrix College	May 2, 2022	802 (LV)	± 4.3%	49%	13%	39%

=== Results ===
Republican primary results
Party	Candidate	Votes	%
Republican	John Thurston (incumbent)	236,974	72.10
Republican	Eddie Joe Williams	91,721	27.90
Total votes		328,695	100.00

== Democratic primary ==
=== Candidates ===
==== Declared ====
- Anna Beth Gorman, executive director of the Women's Foundation of Arkansas

===== Eliminated in primary =====
- Josh Price, former Pulaski County election commissioner

=== Polling ===
Democratic primary results by county Gorman: 50–60% 60–70% 70–80%; Price: 50–60%

Poll source	Date(s) administered	Sample size	Margin of error	Anna Beth Gorman	Josh Price	Undecided
Hendrix College	May 2, 2022	597 (LV)	± 5.0%	22%	21%	57%

=== Results ===
Democratic primary results
Party	Candidate	Votes	%
Democratic	Anna Beth Gorman	52,762	58.60
Democratic	Josh Price	37,280	41.40
Total votes		90,042	100.00

== General election ==
=== Debate ===
2022 Arkansas Secretary of State debate
No.	Date	Host	Moderator	Link	Republican	Democratic
Key: P Participant A Absent N Not invited I Invited W Withdrawn						
Key: P Participant A Absent N Not invited I Invited W Withdrawn					John Thurston	Anna Beth Gorman
1	Oct. 25, 2022	University of Central Arkansas; Arkansas PBS	Steve Barnes	PBS	P	P

=== Predictions ===
Source	Ranking	As of
Sabato's Crystal Ball	Safe R	December 1, 2021
Elections Daily	Safe R	November 7, 2022

=== Results ===
2022 Arkansas secretary of state election
Party	Candidate	Votes	%	±%
Republican	John Thurston (incumbent)	600,194	67.05	+6.41
Democratic	Anna Beth Gorman	294,970	32.95	−3.56
Total votes		895,164	100.00	N/A
Republican hold				

==== By county ====
County	John Thurston Republican		Anna Beth Gorman Democratic		Margin		Total
County	#	%	#	%	#	%	Total
Arkansas	3,327	74.95%	1,112	25.05%	2,215	49.90%	4,439
Ashley	4,072	75.16%	1,346	24.84%	2,726	50.31%	5,418
Baxter	12,215	79.41%	3,168	20.59%	9,047	58.81%	15,383
Benton	59,969	66.66%	29,992	33.34%	29,977	33.32%	89,961
Boone	10,421	82.51%	2,209	17.49%	8,212	65.02%	12,630
Bradley	1,825	70.46%	765	29.54%	1,060	40.93%	2,590
Calhoun	1,273	80.47%	309	19.53%	964	60.94%	1,582
Carroll	5,977	66.57%	3,001	33.43%	2,976	33.15%	8,978
Chicot	1,665	49.27%	1,714	50.73%	-49	-1.45%	3,379
Clark	3,623	60.21%	2,394	39.79%	1,229	20.43%	6,017
Clay	3,147	80.78%	749	19.22%	2,398	61.55%	3,896
Cleburne	8,519	85.48%	1,447	14.52%	7,072	70.96%	9,966
Cleveland	2,339	85.15%	408	14.85%	1,931	70.29%	2,747
Columbia	4,186	69.39%	1,847	30.61%	2,339	38.77%	6,033
Conway	4,650	70.29%	1,965	29.71%	2,685	40.59%	6,615
Craighead	19,168	69.93%	8,244	30.07%	10,924	39.85%	27,412
Crawford	14,099	80.04%	3,517	19.96%	10,582	60.07%	17,616
Crittenden	5,440	51.21%	5,182	48.79%	258	2.43%	10,622
Cross	3,789	77.28%	1,114	22.72%	2,675	54.56%	4,903
Dallas	1,373	67.44%	663	32.56%	710	34.87%	2,036
Desha	1,581	55.30%	1,278	44.70%	303	10.60%	2,859
Drew	3,522	67.33%	1,709	32.67%	1,813	34.66%	5,231
Faulkner	27,130	67.98%	12,778	32.02%	14,352	35.96%	39,908
Franklin	4,196	79.92%	1,054	20.08%	3,142	59.85%	5,250
Fulton	3,178	80.78%	756	19.22%	2,422	61.57%	3,934
Garland	22,657	69.54%	9,923	30.46%	12,734	39.09%	32,580
Grant	5,352	85.60%	900	14.40%	4,452	71.21%	6,252
Greene	9,245	80.65%	2,218	19.35%	7,027	61.30%	11,463
Hempstead	3,388	73.46%	1,224	26.54%	2,164	46.92%	4,612
Hot Spring	7,485	76.55%	2,293	23.45%	5,192	53.10%	9,778
Howard	2,676	73.98%	941	26.02%	1,735	47.97%	3,617
Independence	8,420	80.67%	2,018	19.33%	6,402	61.33%	10,438
Izard	3,743	82.55%	791	17.45%	2,952	65.11%	4,534
Jackson	2,952	73.71%	1,053	26.29%	1,899	47.42%	4,005
Jefferson	7,247	42.67%	9,738	57.33%	-2,491	-14.67%	16,985
Johnson	5,297	76.17%	1,657	23.83%	3,640	52.34%	6,954
Lafayette	1,311	67.54%	630	32.46%	681	35.09%	1,941
Lawrence	3,759	82.69%	787	17.31%	2,972	65.38%	4,546
Lee	982	50.10%	978	49.90%	4	0.20%	1,960
Lincoln	2,042	74.85%	686	25.15%	1,356	49.71%	2,728
Little River	2,930	77.41%	855	22.59%	2,075	54.82%	3,785
Logan	5,013	80.41%	1,221	19.59%	3,792	60.83%	6,234
Lonoke	17,393	78.23%	4,840	21.77%	12,553	56.46%	22,233
Madison	4,524	78.88%	1,211	21.12%	3,313	57.77%	5,735
Marion	4,889	82.21%	1,058	17.79%	3,831	64.42%	5,947
Miller	8,632	76.97%	2,583	23.03%	6,049	53.94%	11,215
Mississippi	5,378	63.86%	3,044	36.14%	2,334	27.71%	8,422
Monroe	1,226	56.24%	954	43.76%	272	12.48%	2,180
Montgomery	2,575	81.95%	567	18.05%	2,008	63.91%	3,142
Nevada	1,690	69.38%	746	30.62%	944	38.75%	2,436
Newton	2,476	81.93%	546	18.07%	1,930	63.86%	3,022
Ouachita	4,199	60.43%	2,749	39.57%	1,450	20.87%	6,948
Perry	2,969	78.98%	790	21.02%	2,179	57.97%	3,759
Phillips	1,939	45.97%	2,279	54.03%	-340	-8.06%	4,218
Pike	3,176	86.35%	502	13.65%	2,674	72.70%	3,678
Poinsett	4,465	80.81%	1,060	19.19%	3,405	61.63%	5,525
Polk	5,829	85.05%	1,025	14.95%	4,804	70.09%	6,854
Pope	13,481	77.31%	3,956	22.69%	9,525	54.63%	17,437
Prairie	2,211	83.75%	429	16.25%	1,782	67.50%	2,640
Pulaski	53,040	43.26%	69,557	56.74%	-16,517	-13.47%	122,597
Randolph	4,284	82.10%	934	17.90%	3,350	64.20%	5,218
Saline	31,831	74.32%	11,001	25.68%	20,830	48.63%	42,832
Scott	2,524	86.62%	390	13.38%	2,134	73.23%	2,914
Searcy	2,639	85.32%	454	14.68%	2,185	70.64%	3,093
Sebastian	24,172	71.26%	9,748	28.74%	14,424	42.52%	33,920
Sevier	2,896	80.44%	704	19.56%	2,192	60.89%	3,600
Sharp	4,955	82.62%	1,042	17.38%	3,913	65.25%	5,997
St. Francis	2,532	50.52%	2,480	49.48%	52	1.04%	5,012
Stone	4,006	79.83%	1,012	20.17%	2,994	59.67%	5,018
Union	7,994	69.20%	3,558	30.80%	4,436	38.40%	11,552
Van Buren	4,974	80.55%	1,201	19.45%	3,773	61.10%	6,175
Washington	37,663	53.91%	32,203	46.09%	5,460	7.81%	69,866
White	18,788	82.11%	4,093	17.89%	14,695	64.22%	22,881
Woodruff	1,357	66.07%	697	33.93%	660	32.13%	2,054
Yell	4,304	82.34%	923	17.66%	3,381	64.68%	5,227
Totals	600,194	67.05%	294,970	32.95%	305,224	34.10%	895,164

Counties that flipped from Democratic to Republican

- Crittenden (largest city: West Memphis)
- Desha (largest city: Dumas)
- Lee (largest city: Marianna)
- St. Francis (largest city: Forrest City)

==== By congressional district ====
Thurston won all four congressional districts.

District	Thurston	Beth Gorman	Representative
1st	73%	27%	Rick Crawford
2nd	61%	39%	French Hill
3rd	64%	36%	Steve Womack
4th	71%	29%	Bruce Westerman
