= 2026 Arkansas State Treasurer election =

- November 3, 2026
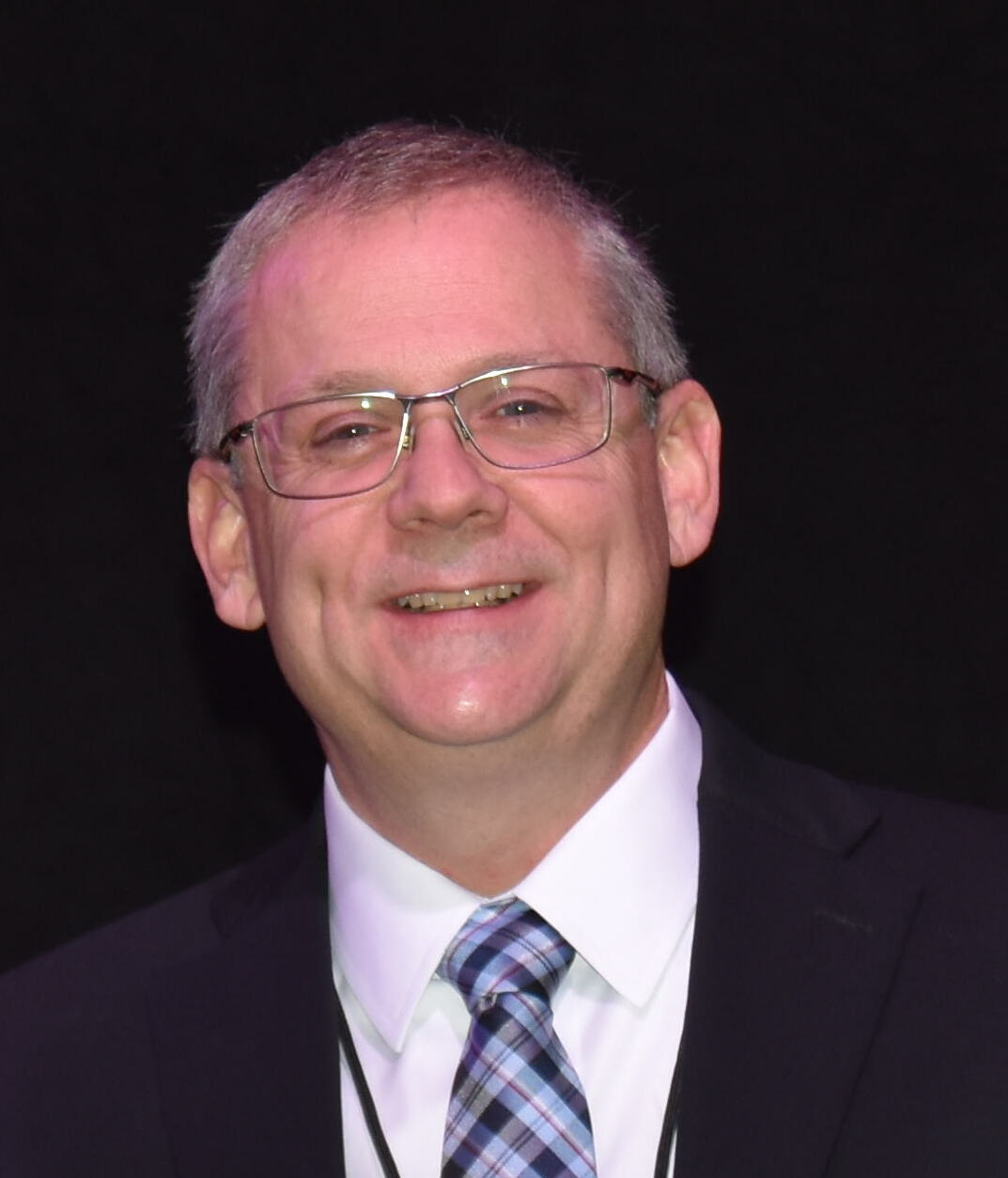
Nominee	John Thurston
Party	Republican
Incumbent State Treasurer
John Thurston
Republican

The 2026 Arkansas State Treasurer election is scheduled to take place on November 3, 2026, to elect the Arkansas State Treasurer. Incumbent Republican State Treasurer Thurston won re-election to a full term in office, running unopposed.

== Republican primary ==
=== Candidates ===
==== Nominee ====
- John Thurston, incumbent state treasurer

== See also ==
- 2026 United States state treasurer elections
- 2026 Arkansas elections
