= 2018 Arkansas lieutenant gubernatorial election =

- November 6, 2018
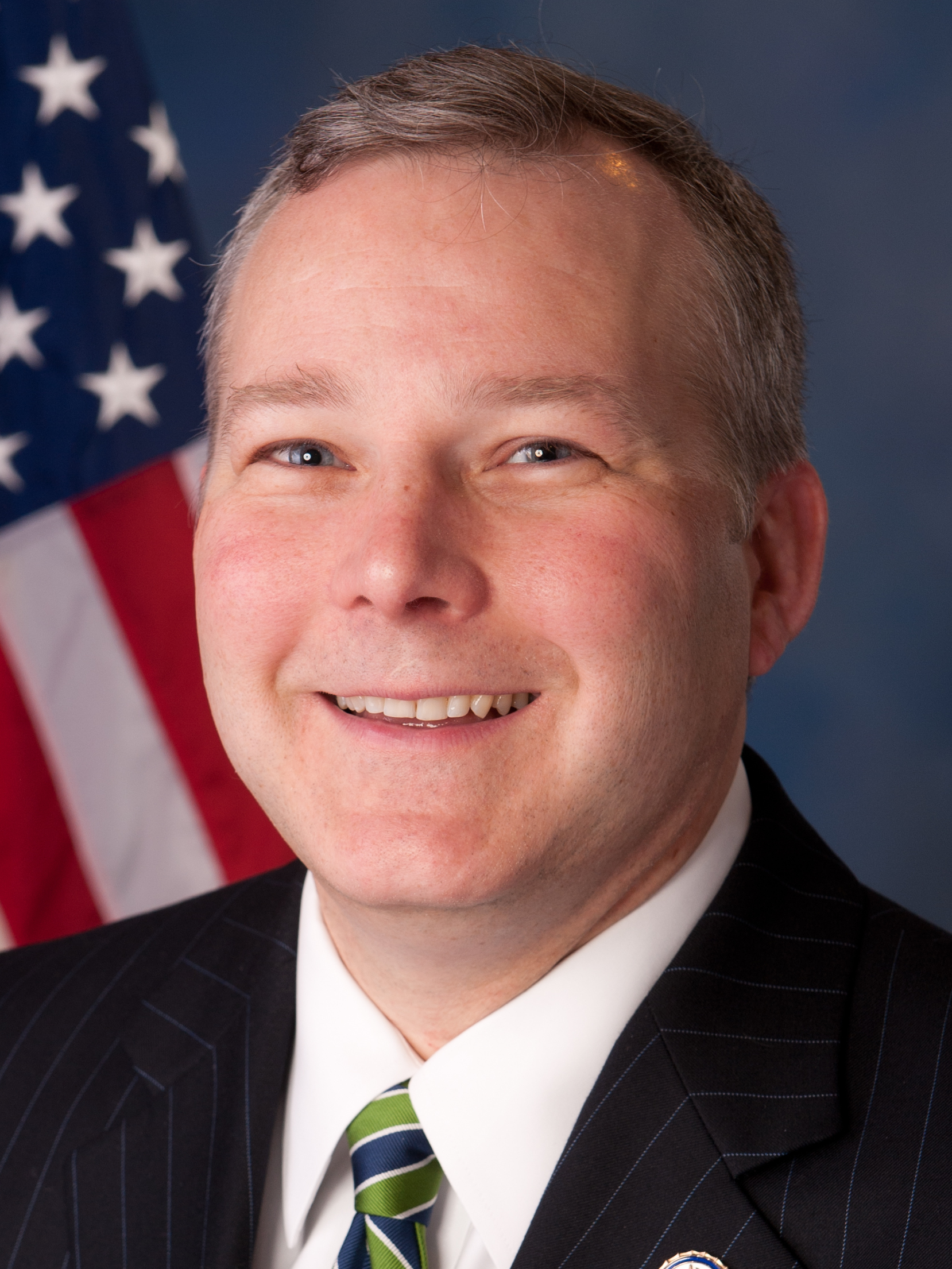

Nominee	Tim Griffin	Anthony Bland
Party	Republican	Democratic
Popular vote	570,433	293,535
Percentage	64.18%	33.03%
- Griffin: 50–60% 60–70% 70–80% 80–90% Bland: 50–60%
Lieutenant Governor before election
Tim Griffin
Republican
Elected Lieutenant Governor
Tim Griffin
Republican

The 2018 Arkansas lieutenant gubernatorial election was held on November 6, 2018, to elect the Lieutenant Governor of Arkansas, concurrently with elections to the United States House of Representatives, governor, and other state and local elections. Primary elections were held on May 22, 2018, with runoff elections held on June 19.

Incumbent Republican lieutenant governor Tim Griffin won re-election to a second term in office.

== Republican primary ==
=== Candidates ===
==== Nominee ====
- Tim Griffin, incumbent lieutenant governor (2015–present) and former U.S. representative from AR-2 (2011–2015)

=== Results ===
Republican primary results
Party	Candidate	Votes	%
Republican	Tim Griffin (incumbent)	Unopposed	
Total votes		—N/a	100.0

== Democratic primary ==
=== Candidates ===
==== Nominee ====
- Anthony Bland, business owner (previously ran for secretary of state)

=== Results ===
Democratic primary results
Party	Candidate	Votes	%
Democratic	Anthony Bland	Unopposed	
Total votes		—N/a	100.0

== General election ==
=== Post-primary endorsements ===
Tim Griffin (R)

Newspapers and other media

- Arkansas Democrat-Gazette

=== Results ===
2018 Arkansas lieutenant gubernatorial election
Party	Candidate	Votes	%
Republican	Tim Griffin (incumbent)	570,433	64.18
Democratic	Anthony Bland	293,535	33.03
Libertarian	Frank Gilbert	24,767	2.79
Total votes		888,735	100.00
Republican hold			

==== By county ====
County	Tim Griffin Republican		Anthony Bland Democratic		Frank Gilbert Libertarian		Margin		Total
County	#	%	#	%	#	%	#	%	Total
Arkansas	3,531	71.28%	1,347	27.19%	76	1.53%	2,184	44.09%	4,954
Ashley	4,217	68.62%	1,839	29.93%	89	1.45%	2,378	38.70%	6,145
Baxter	10,438	73.01%	3,269	22.86%	590	4.13%	7,169	50.14%	14,297
Benton	51,365	66.59%	23,526	30.50%	2,244	2.91%	27,839	36.09%	77,135
Boone	8,984	77.55%	2,258	19.49%	343	2.96%	6,726	58.06%	11,585
Bradley	1,867	65.51%	901	31.61%	82	2.88%	966	33.89%	2,850
Calhoun	1,303	73.12%	441	24.75%	38	2.13%	862	48.37%	1,782
Carroll	5,599	62.52%	3,110	34.73%	246	2.75%	2,489	27.79%	8,955
Chicot	1,537	43.42%	1,955	55.23%	48	1.36%	-418	-11.81%	3,540
Clark	3,898	57.81%	2,726	40.43%	119	1.76%	1,172	17.38%	6,743
Clay	3,015	73.43%	992	24.16%	99	2.41%	2,023	49.27%	4,106
Cleburne	7,940	82.38%	1,483	15.39%	215	2.23%	6,457	67.00%	9,638
Cleveland	2,060	79.57%	495	19.12%	34	1.31%	1,565	60.45%	2,589
Columbia	4,170	65.85%	2,082	32.88%	81	1.28%	2,088	32.97%	6,333
Conway	4,304	66.67%	2,011	31.15%	141	2.18%	2,293	35.52%	6,456
Craighead	17,380	66.79%	7,822	30.06%	819	3.15%	9,558	36.73%	26,021
Crawford	13,043	77.46%	3,337	19.82%	459	2.73%	9,706	57.64%	16,839
Crittenden	5,542	46.55%	6,127	51.47%	236	1.98%	-585	-4.91%	11,905
Cross	4,159	71.72%	1,534	26.45%	106	1.83%	2,625	45.27%	5,799
Dallas	1,278	60.43%	813	38.44%	24	1.13%	465	21.99%	2,115
Desha	1,761	51.04%	1,588	46.03%	101	2.93%	173	5.01%	3,450
Drew	3,572	66.41%	1,687	31.36%	120	2.23%	1,885	35.04%	5,379
Faulkner	25,438	66.13%	11,856	30.82%	1,175	3.05%	13,582	35.31%	38,469
Franklin	4,086	77.37%	1,058	20.03%	137	2.59%	3,028	57.34%	5,281
Fulton	2,709	71.31%	997	26.24%	93	2.45%	1,712	45.06%	3,799
Garland	21,617	68.07%	9,279	29.22%	860	2.71%	12,338	38.85%	31,756
Grant	4,518	81.48%	912	16.45%	115	2.07%	3,606	65.03%	5,545
Greene	8,359	76.53%	2,234	20.45%	329	3.01%	6,125	56.08%	10,922
Hempstead	3,236	65.32%	1,633	32.96%	85	1.72%	1,603	32.36%	4,954
Hot Spring	6,325	72.40%	2,204	25.23%	207	2.37%	4,121	47.17%	8,736
Howard	2,450	69.78%	1,010	28.77%	51	1.45%	1,440	41.01%	3,511
Independence	7,892	77.82%	1,958	19.31%	291	2.87%	5,934	58.51%	10,141
Izard	3,440	77.11%	899	20.15%	122	2.73%	2,541	56.96%	4,461
Jackson	2,902	69.43%	1,200	28.71%	78	1.87%	1,702	40.72%	4,180
Jefferson	8,115	41.13%	11,159	56.56%	454	2.30%	-3,044	-15.43%	19,728
Johnson	5,336	71.70%	1,845	24.79%	261	3.51%	3,491	46.91%	7,442
Lafayette	1,360	64.15%	726	34.25%	34	1.60%	634	29.91%	2,120
Lawrence	3,470	74.58%	1,053	22.63%	130	2.79%	2,417	51.94%	4,653
Lee	915	43.32%	1,157	54.78%	40	1.89%	-242	-11.46%	2,112
Lincoln	2,100	69.28%	860	28.37%	71	2.34%	1,240	40.91%	3,031
Little River	2,723	69.52%	1,097	28.01%	97	2.48%	1,626	41.51%	3,917
Logan	4,207	76.31%	1,149	20.84%	157	2.85%	3,058	55.47%	5,513
Lonoke	15,874	77.11%	4,190	20.35%	523	2.54%	11,684	56.75%	20,587
Madison	3,948	71.72%	1,396	25.36%	161	2.92%	2,552	46.36%	5,505
Marion	3,906	75.79%	1,105	21.44%	143	2.77%	2,801	54.35%	5,154
Miller	8,266	72.38%	3,001	26.28%	153	1.34%	5,265	46.10%	11,420
Mississippi	6,179	59.53%	3,853	37.12%	348	3.35%	2,326	22.41%	10,380
Monroe	1,443	55.12%	1,138	43.47%	37	1.41%	305	11.65%	2,618
Montgomery	2,207	77.90%	573	20.23%	53	1.87%	1,634	57.68%	2,833
Nevada	1,593	63.31%	891	35.41%	32	1.27%	702	27.90%	2,516
Newton	2,359	76.22%	651	21.03%	85	2.75%	1,708	55.19%	3,095
Ouachita	4,125	55.85%	3,143	42.55%	118	1.60%	982	13.30%	7,386
Perry	2,754	74.61%	829	22.46%	108	2.93%	1,925	52.15%	3,691
Phillips	2,173	40.06%	3,105	57.25%	146	2.69%	-932	-17.18%	5,424
Pike	2,711	81.05%	569	17.01%	65	1.94%	2,142	64.04%	3,345
Poinsett	4,603	75.74%	1,311	21.57%	163	2.68%	3,292	54.17%	6,077
Polk	4,945	81.82%	914	15.12%	185	3.06%	4,031	66.69%	6,044
Pope	13,574	75.75%	3,811	21.27%	534	2.98%	9,763	54.48%	17,919
Prairie	2,223	77.95%	579	20.30%	50	1.75%	1,644	57.64%	2,852
Pulaski	60,303	44.94%	69,605	51.87%	4,273	3.18%	-9,302	-6.93%	134,181
Randolph	4,141	73.79%	1,266	22.56%	205	3.65%	2,875	51.23%	5,612
Saline	30,195	72.83%	10,011	24.15%	1,251	3.02%	20,184	48.69%	41,457
Scott	2,311	80.97%	445	15.59%	98	3.43%	1,866	65.38%	2,854
Searcy	2,528	79.92%	533	16.85%	102	3.22%	1,995	63.07%	3,163
Sebastian	23,004	69.41%	8,923	26.92%	1,215	3.67%	14,081	42.49%	33,142
Sevier	2,390	74.66%	713	22.27%	98	3.06%	1,677	52.39%	3,201
Sharp	4,390	77.51%	1,133	20.00%	141	2.49%	3,257	57.50%	5,664
St. Francis	2,600	44.91%	3,057	52.81%	132	2.28%	-457	-7.89%	5,789
Stone	3,348	75.63%	967	21.84%	112	2.53%	2,381	53.78%	4,427
Union	7,956	64.75%	4,104	33.40%	227	1.85%	3,852	31.35%	12,287
Van Buren	4,871	77.68%	1,204	19.20%	196	3.13%	3,667	58.48%	6,271
Washington	34,384	52.45%	29,166	44.49%	2,008	3.06%	5,218	7.96%	65,558
White	17,702	80.43%	3,782	17.18%	525	2.39%	13,920	63.25%	22,009
Woodruff	1,195	57.67%	828	39.96%	49	2.36%	367	17.71%	2,072
Yell	4,071	76.59%	1,110	20.88%	134	2.52%	2,961	55.71%	5,315
Totals	570,433	64.18%	293,535	33.03%	24,767	2.79%	276,898	31.16%	888,735

==== Counties that flipped from Democratic to Republican ====
Griffin won five counties that had previously voted for Democratic candidate John Burkhalter in 2014.

- Clark (largest city: Arkadelphia)
- Desha (largest city: Dumas)
- Mississippi (largest city: Blytheville)
- Monroe (largest city: Brinkley)
- Woodruff (largest city: Augusta)

==== By congressional district ====
Griffin won all four congressional districts.

District	Griffin	Bland	Representative
1st	68%	29%	Rick Crawford
2nd	58%	39%	French Hill
3rd	65%	32%	Steve Womack
4th	68%	30%	Bruce Westerman
