= Trevor Drown =

American politician

Ronald Trevor Drown

Member of the Arkansas House of Representatives from the 68th district
- In office January 2015 – January 2019
- Preceded by: Robert E. Dale
- Succeeded by: Stan Berry

Personal details
- Born: c. 1970 Russellville, Arkansas, U.S.
- Party: Republican

Military service
- Branch/service: United States Army United States Air National Guard United States Air Force Reserve

Ronald Trevor Drown (born c. 1970) is a U.S. Army Green Beret, a Sergeant Major (E-9) in the 20th Special Forces Group (Airborne) and a businessman from Dover, Arkansas. He is an American politician who was a Republican member of the Arkansas House of Representatives. He represented the 68th district, which contained much of Pope County and Van Buren County. Drown ran in 2018 for election as Arkansas secretary of state.

== Political career ==
Drown joined the Republican Party to contest the 68th district state house seat, which was vacated by term-limited Republican Robert E. Dale. He won the primary election on May 20, 2014, against Zachary Tyler Sellers and Ingram Philips. Drown won the general election over Democrat Tachany Evans, 9,847 votes (77.9 percent) to 2,222 (22.1 percent) on November 4, 2014.

Drown ran for Arkansas secretary of state in 2018 but was defeated by John Thurston in the Republican primary.

Preceded by Robert E. Dale	Arkansas State Representative for District 68 (Pope and Van Buren counties); 2015–2019	Succeeded by Stan Berry
