= 2014 Arkansas Commissioner of State Lands election =

- November 4, 2014
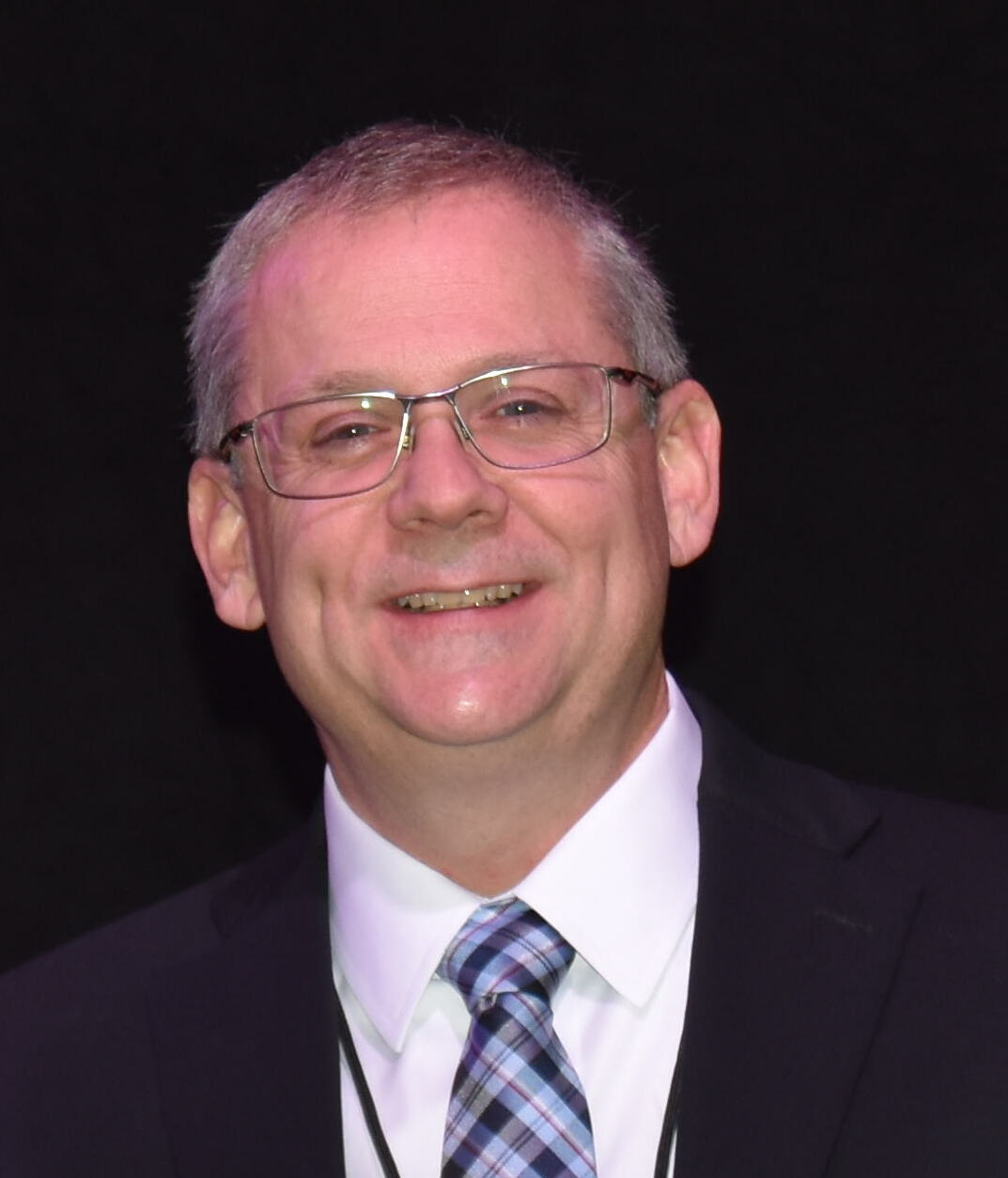

Nominee	John Thurston	Mark Robertson	Elvis D. Presley
Party	Republican	Democratic	Libertarian
Popular vote	471,848	302,048	51,518
Percentage	57.17%	36.59%	6.24%
- County results Thurston: 40–50% 50–60% 60–70% 70–80% Robertson: 40–50% 50–60% 60–70%
Commissioner of State Lands before election
John Thurston
Republican
Elected Commissioner of State Lands
John Thurston
Republican

The 2014 Arkansas Commissioner of State Lands election was held on November 4, 2014, to elect the Arkansas Commissioner of State Lands. Incumbent Republican Land Commissioner John Thurston was re-elected to a second term in office, defeating Democratic challenger Mark Robertson in a landslide.

== Republican primary ==
=== Candidates ===
==== Nominee ====
- John Thurston, incumbent land commissioner (2011–2019)

== Democratic primary ==
=== Candidates ===
==== Nominee ====
- Mark Robertson, landscape architect

== Libertarian primary ==
=== Candidates ===
==== Nominee ====
- Elvis D. Presley, Elvis Presley impersonator and auto mechanic

== General election ==
=== Polling ===
Poll source	Date(s) administered	Sample size	Margin of error	John Thurston (R)	Mark Robertson (D)	Elvis D. Presley (L)	Undecided
Public Policy Polling	October 30–November 1, 2014	1,092	± 3%	45%	36%	9%	10%
Public Policy Polling	September 18–21, 2014	1,453	± 2.6%	38%	33%	7%	22%
Public Policy Polling	August 1–3, 2014	1,066	± 3%	40%	29%	10%	22%
Public Policy Polling	April 25–27, 2014	840	± 3.4%	28%	27%	17%	29%

=== Results ===
2014 Arkansas Commissioner of State Lands election
Party	Candidate	Votes	%
Republican	John Thurston (incumbent)	471,848	57.17
Democratic	Mark Robertson	302,048	36.59
Libertarian	Elvis D. Presley	51,518	6.24
Total votes		825,414	100.00
Republican hold			

==== By county ====
County	John Thurston Republican		Mark Robertson Democratic		Elvis D. Presley Libertarian		Margin		Total
County	#	%	#	%	#	%	#	%	Total
Arkansas	2,726	54.96%	1,994	40.20%	240	4.84%	732	14.76%	4,960
Ashley	3,398	55.32%	2,548	41.48%	196	3.19%	850	13.84%	6,142
Baxter	9,658	66.51%	3,833	26.40%	1,030	7.09%	5,825	40.11%	14,521
Benton	42,228	69.35%	14,405	23.66%	4,261	7.00%	27,823	45.69%	60,894
Boone	7,153	67.57%	2,635	24.89%	798	7.54%	4,518	42.68%	10,586
Bradley	1,502	52.98%	1,232	43.46%	101	3.56%	270	9.52%	2,835
Calhoun	952	58.98%	578	35.81%	84	5.20%	374	23.17%	1,614
Carroll	4,506	57.16%	2,771	35.15%	606	7.69%	1,735	22.01%	7,883
Chicot	1,199	34.73%	2,169	62.83%	84	2.43%	-970	-28.10%	3,452
Clark	3,086	45.44%	3,406	50.15%	299	4.40%	-320	-4.71%	6,791
Clay	2,135	54.94%	1,525	39.24%	226	5.82%	610	15.70%	3,886
Cleburne	6,555	67.71%	2,481	25.63%	645	6.66%	4,074	42.08%	9,681
Cleveland	1,628	60.52%	895	33.27%	167	6.21%	733	27.25%	2,690
Columbia	4,513	60.52%	2,515	33.73%	429	5.75%	1,998	26.79%	7,457
Conway	3,055	48.81%	2,855	45.61%	349	5.58%	200	3.20%	6,259
Craighead	14,836	60.18%	8,140	33.02%	1,677	6.80%	6,696	27.16%	24,653
Crawford	10,633	66.86%	4,058	25.52%	1,212	7.62%	6,575	41.34%	15,903
Crittenden	4,569	43.61%	5,578	53.24%	331	3.16%	-1,009	-9.63%	10,478
Cross	3,010	58.36%	1,908	36.99%	240	4.65%	1,102	21.36%	5,158
Dallas	1,159	49.51%	1,094	46.73%	88	3.76%	65	2.78%	2,341
Desha	1,168	35.68%	1,960	59.87%	146	4.46%	-792	-24.19%	3,274
Drew	2,701	52.70%	2,197	42.87%	227	4.43%	504	9.83%	5,125
Faulkner	20,230	61.26%	10,502	31.80%	2,291	6.94%	9,728	29.46%	33,023
Franklin	3,159	58.60%	1,881	34.89%	351	6.51%	1,278	23.71%	5,391
Fulton	1,919	58.01%	1,182	35.73%	207	6.26%	737	22.28%	3,308
Garland	18,240	60.74%	9,768	32.53%	2,020	6.73%	8,472	28.21%	30,028
Grant	3,577	67.34%	1,427	26.86%	308	5.80%	2,150	40.47%	5,312
Greene	6,549	60.72%	3,545	32.87%	692	6.42%	3,004	27.85%	10,786
Hempstead	3,061	57.43%	2,064	38.72%	205	3.85%	997	18.71%	5,330
Hot Spring	5,026	54.39%	3,607	39.03%	608	6.58%	1,419	15.36%	9,241
Howard	2,048	56.72%	1,418	39.27%	145	4.02%	630	17.45%	3,611
Independence	6,371	61.46%	3,173	30.61%	822	7.93%	3,198	30.85%	10,366
Izard	2,497	58.59%	1,477	34.66%	288	6.76%	1,020	23.93%	4,262
Jackson	2,039	50.31%	1,735	42.81%	279	6.88%	304	7.50%	4,053
Jefferson	6,683	34.13%	12,223	62.43%	673	3.44%	-5,540	-28.30%	19,579
Johnson	3,533	54.76%	2,414	37.41%	505	7.83%	1,119	17.34%	6,452
Lafayette	1,304	55.07%	975	41.17%	89	3.76%	329	13.89%	2,368
Lawrence	2,453	54.31%	1,737	38.45%	327	7.24%	716	15.85%	4,517
Lee	904	35.01%	1,614	62.51%	64	2.48%	-710	-27.50%	2,582
Lincoln	1,435	47.42%	1,332	44.02%	259	8.56%	103	3.40%	3,026
Little River	2,263	56.82%	1,532	38.46%	188	4.72%	731	18.35%	3,983
Logan	3,784	59.56%	2,103	33.10%	466	7.34%	1,681	26.46%	6,353
Lonoke	13,288	69.24%	4,686	24.42%	1,217	6.34%	8,602	44.82%	19,191
Madison	2,938	59.23%	1,699	34.25%	323	6.51%	1,239	24.98%	4,960
Marion	3,254	66.46%	1,281	26.16%	361	7.37%	1,973	40.30%	4,896
Miller	7,438	65.80%	3,490	30.87%	376	3.33%	3,948	34.93%	11,304
Mississippi	4,506	45.47%	4,888	49.32%	516	5.21%	-382	-3.85%	9,910
Monroe	1,013	43.35%	1,232	52.72%	92	3.94%	-219	-9.37%	2,337
Montgomery	1,734	60.95%	911	32.02%	200	7.03%	823	28.93%	2,845
Nevada	1,358	50.11%	1,236	45.61%	116	4.28%	122	4.50%	2,710
Newton	1,865	63.31%	852	28.92%	229	7.77%	1,013	34.39%	2,946
Ouachita	3,828	50.55%	2,746	36.26%	999	13.19%	1,082	14.29%	7,573
Perry	1,995	57.25%	1,236	35.47%	254	7.29%	759	21.78%	3,485
Phillips	1,904	33.76%	3,592	63.70%	143	2.54%	-1,688	-29.93%	5,639
Pike	1,910	62.95%	937	30.88%	187	6.16%	973	32.07%	3,034
Poinsett	3,494	56.15%	2,291	36.82%	438	7.04%	1,203	19.33%	6,223
Polk	4,236	68.07%	1,473	23.67%	514	8.26%	2,763	44.40%	6,223
Pope	11,140	66.33%	4,398	26.18%	1,258	7.49%	6,742	40.14%	16,796
Prairie	1,562	60.15%	831	32.00%	204	7.86%	731	28.15%	2,597
Pulaski	52,681	42.67%	64,592	52.31%	6,198	5.02%	-11,911	-9.65%	123,471
Randolph	2,704	54.80%	1,855	37.60%	375	7.60%	849	17.21%	4,934
Saline	26,110	67.41%	9,962	25.72%	2,661	6.87%	16,148	41.69%	38,733
Scott	1,858	62.37%	878	29.47%	243	8.16%	980	32.90%	2,979
Searcy	2,088	71.31%	643	21.96%	197	6.73%	1,445	49.35%	2,928
Sebastian	20,256	65.02%	8,821	28.31%	2,077	6.67%	11,435	36.70%	31,154
Sevier	2,146	61.61%	1,155	33.16%	182	5.23%	991	28.45%	3,483
Sharp	3,486	62.41%	1,724	30.86%	376	6.73%	1,762	31.54%	5,586
St. Francis	2,281	38.60%	3,437	58.17%	191	3.23%	-1,156	-19.56%	5,909
Stone	2,650	60.38%	1,435	32.70%	304	6.93%	1,215	27.68%	4,389
Union	7,013	58.93%	4,222	35.48%	666	5.60%	2,791	23.45%	11,901
Van Buren	3,496	60.34%	1,858	32.07%	440	7.59%	1,638	28.27%	5,794
Washington	29,900	56.70%	18,995	36.02%	3,837	7.28%	10,905	20.68%	52,732
White	14,573	68.14%	5,179	24.22%	1,635	7.64%	9,394	43.92%	21,387
Woodruff	747	35.40%	1,216	57.63%	147	6.97%	-469	-22.23%	2,110
Yell	2,951	57.85%	1,811	35.50%	339	6.65%	1,140	22.35%	5,101
Totals	471,848	57.17%	302,048	36.59%	51,518	6.24%	169,800	20.57%	825,414

Counties that flipped from Democratic to Republican

- Arkansas (largest city: Stuttgart)
- Ashley (largest city: Crossett)
- Bradley (largest city: Warren)
- Calhoun (largest city: Hampton)
- Clay (largest city: Piggott)
- Cleveland (largest city: Rison)
- Conway (largest city: Morrilton)
- Craighead (largest city: Jonesboro)
- Cross (largest city: Wynne)
- Dallas (largest city: Fordyce)
- Drew (largest city: Monticello)
- Hempstead (largest city: Hope)
- Hot Spring (largest city: Malvern)
- Howard (largest city: Nashville)
- Izard (largest city: Horseshoe Bend)
- Jackson (largest city: Newport)
- Lawrence (largest city: Walnut Ridge)
- Lincoln (largest city: Star City)
- Little River (largest city: Ashdown)
- Nevada (largest city: Prescott)
- Ouachita (largest city: Camden)
- Pike (largest city: Glenwood)
- Poinsett (largest city: Trumann)
- Prairie (largest city: Des Arc)
- Randolph (largest city: Pocahontas)

== See also ==
- 2014 Arkansas elections
