= 2018 Arkansas Secretary of State election =

- November 6, 2018
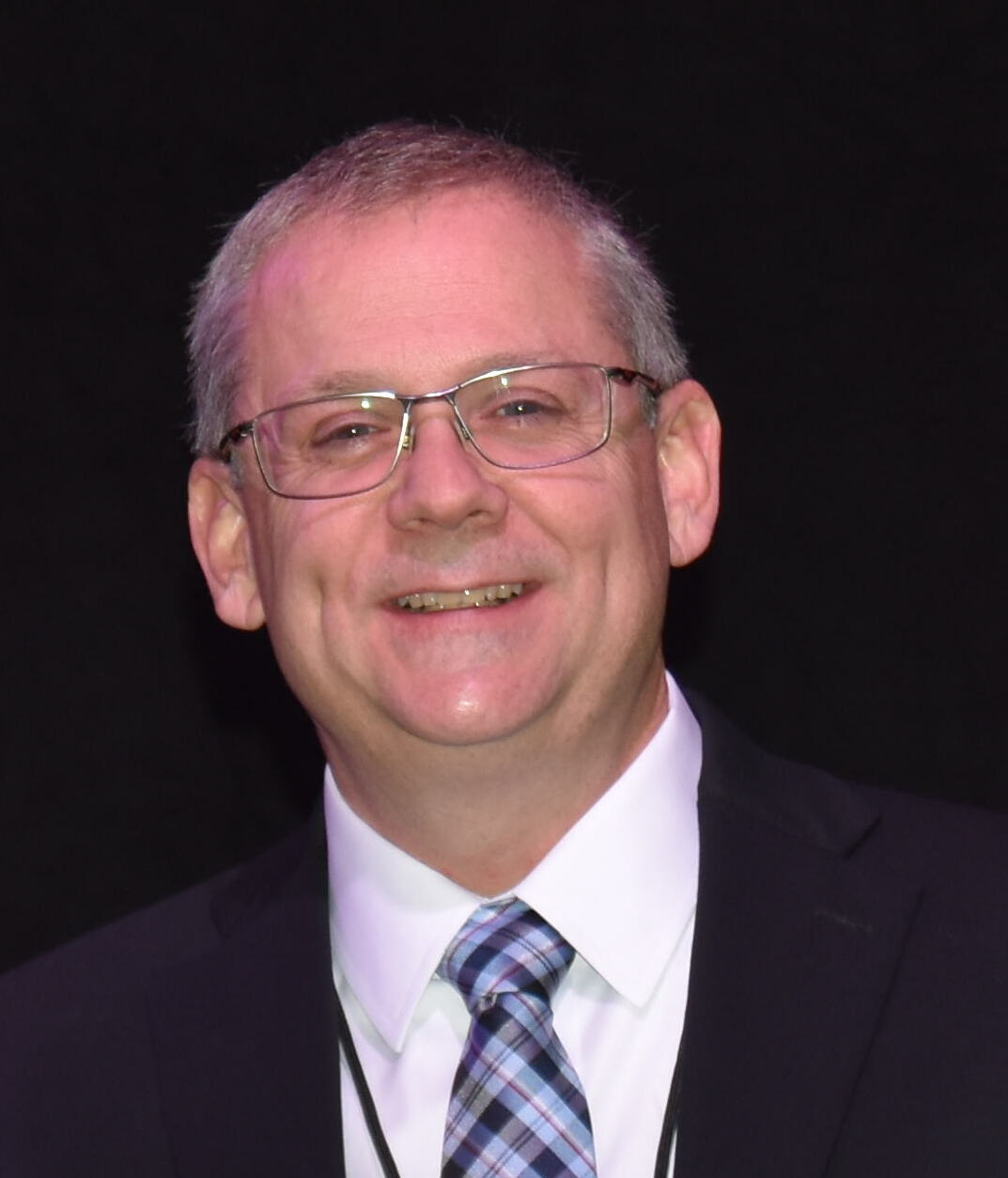

Nominee	John Thurston	Susan Inman
Party	Republican	Democratic
Popular vote	537,581	323,644
Percentage	60.64%	36.51%
- County results Thurston: 40–50% 50–60% 60–70% 70–80% Inman: 50–60% 60–70%
Secretary of State before election
Mark Martin
Republican
Elected Secretary of State
John Thurston
Republican

The 2018 Arkansas Secretary of State election took place on November 6, 2018, to elect the Secretary of State of Arkansas. Incumbent Republican Mark Martin was term-limited and ineligible to seek re-election to a third term in office. Republican Arkansas Commissioner of State Lands John Thurston defeated Democrat Susan Inman to succeed Martin. Primary elections were held on May 22.

== Republican primary ==
=== Candidates ===
==== Nominee ====
- John Thurston, commissioner of state lands of Arkansas (2011–2019)

===== Eliminated in primary =====
- Trevor Drown, state representative (2015–2019)

=== Results ===
Results by county Thurston: 50–60%; 60–70%; 70–80%; 80–90%; Drown: 50–60%; 60–70%; 80–90%

Republican primary results
Party	Candidate	Votes	%
Republican	John Thurston	100,799	52.57
Republican	Trevor Drown	90,933	47.43
Total votes		191,732	100.00

== Democratic primary ==
=== Candidates ===
==== Nominee ====
- Susan Inman, Director of Elections under former Secretary of State Sharon Priest

===== Withdrew =====
- Anthony Bland, business owner (ran for lieutenant governor)

== Libertarian primary ==
=== Candidates ===
==== Nominee ====
- Christopher Olson

== General election ==
=== Predictions ===
Source	Ranking	As of
Governing	Likely R	October 11, 2018

=== Results ===
2018 Arkansas secretary of state election
Party	Candidate	Votes	%	±%
Republican	John Thurston	537,581	60.64	+0.03
Democratic	Susan Inman	323,644	36.51	+1.45
Libertarian	Christopher Olson	25,320	2.86	–1.47
Total votes		886,545	100.00	N/A
Republican hold				

==== By county ====
County	John Thurston Republican		Susan Inman Democratic		Christopher Olson Libertarian		Margin		Total
County	#	%	#	%	#	%	#	%	Total
Arkansas	3,187	64.49%	1,660	33.59%	95	1.92%	1,527	30.90%	4,942
Ashley	4,119	66.85%	1,962	31.84%	81	1.31%	2,157	35.00%	6,162
Baxter	10,323	72.25%	3,389	23.72%	576	4.03%	6,934	48.53%	14,288
Benton	49,408	64.21%	24,961	32.44%	2,580	3.35%	24,447	31.77%	76,949
Boone	8,813	76.09%	2,480	21.41%	290	2.50%	6,333	54.67%	11,583
Bradley	1,803	63.22%	988	34.64%	61	2.14%	815	28.58%	2,852
Calhoun	1,238	69.47%	509	28.56%	35	1.96%	729	40.91%	1,782
Carroll	5,417	60.62%	3,262	36.50%	257	2.88%	2,155	24.12%	8,936
Chicot	1,489	41.93%	2,020	56.89%	42	1.18%	-531	-14.95%	3,551
Clark	3,589	53.21%	3,016	44.71%	140	2.08%	573	8.50%	6,745
Clay	2,984	72.50%	1,014	24.64%	118	2.87%	1,970	47.86%	4,116
Cleburne	7,643	79.40%	1,781	18.50%	202	2.10%	5,862	60.90%	9,626
Cleveland	1,942	75.13%	605	23.40%	38	1.47%	1,337	51.72%	2,585
Columbia	4,017	63.53%	2,203	34.84%	103	1.63%	1,814	28.69%	6,323
Conway	3,909	60.83%	2,283	35.53%	234	3.64%	1,626	25.30%	6,426
Craighead	16,849	64.91%	8,370	32.24%	740	2.85%	8,479	32.66%	25,959
Crawford	12,570	74.83%	3,743	22.28%	485	2.89%	8,827	52.55%	16,798
Crittenden	5,433	45.62%	6,241	52.41%	234	1.97%	-808	-6.79%	11,908
Cross	3,975	68.56%	1,720	29.67%	103	1.78%	2,255	38.89%	5,798
Dallas	1,214	57.29%	874	41.25%	31	1.46%	340	16.05%	2,119
Desha	1,532	44.70%	1,800	52.52%	95	2.77%	-268	-7.82%	3,427
Drew	3,293	61.44%	1,934	36.08%	133	2.48%	1,359	25.35%	5,360
Faulkner	23,609	61.63%	13,420	35.03%	1,277	3.33%	10,189	26.60%	38,306
Franklin	3,843	72.94%	1,293	24.54%	133	2.52%	2,550	48.40%	5,269
Fulton	2,579	67.87%	1,102	29.00%	119	3.13%	1,477	38.87%	3,800
Garland	20,374	64.53%	10,308	32.65%	890	2.82%	10,066	31.88%	31,572
Grant	4,294	77.45%	1,126	20.31%	124	2.24%	3,168	57.14%	5,544
Greene	7,980	73.08%	2,647	24.24%	293	2.68%	5,333	48.84%	10,920
Hempstead	3,180	64.15%	1,699	34.27%	78	1.57%	1,481	29.88%	4,957
Hot Spring	6,013	68.87%	2,510	28.75%	208	2.38%	3,503	40.12%	8,731
Howard	2,362	67.24%	1,101	31.34%	50	1.42%	1,261	35.90%	3,513
Independence	7,440	73.66%	2,373	23.49%	288	2.85%	5,067	50.16%	10,101
Izard	3,261	73.00%	1,086	24.31%	120	2.69%	2,175	48.69%	4,467
Jackson	2,697	64.57%	1,380	33.04%	100	2.39%	1,317	31.53%	4,177
Jefferson	7,318	37.15%	11,662	59.20%	718	3.65%	-4,344	-22.05%	19,698
Johnson	5,066	68.16%	2,124	28.58%	242	3.26%	2,942	39.59%	7,432
Lafayette	1,354	63.48%	746	34.97%	33	1.55%	608	28.50%	2,133
Lawrence	3,236	69.59%	1,252	26.92%	162	3.48%	1,984	42.67%	4,650
Lee	884	41.94%	1,190	56.45%	34	1.61%	-306	-14.52%	2,108
Lincoln	1,924	63.71%	1,054	34.90%	42	1.39%	870	28.81%	3,020
Little River	2,698	68.62%	1,171	29.78%	63	1.60%	1,527	38.84%	3,932
Logan	4,009	72.63%	1,350	24.46%	161	2.92%	2,659	48.17%	5,520
Lonoke	14,961	72.86%	4,955	24.13%	617	3.00%	10,006	48.73%	20,533
Madison	3,829	69.62%	1,513	27.51%	158	2.87%	2,316	42.11%	5,500
Marion	3,851	74.62%	1,162	22.52%	148	2.87%	2,689	52.10%	5,161
Miller	8,168	71.55%	3,097	27.13%	150	1.31%	5,071	44.42%	11,415
Mississippi	5,945	57.20%	4,095	39.40%	354	3.41%	1,850	17.80%	10,394
Monroe	1,290	49.31%	1,239	47.36%	87	3.33%	51	1.95%	2,616
Montgomery	2,115	74.42%	658	23.15%	69	2.43%	1,457	51.27%	2,842
Nevada	1,531	60.78%	957	37.99%	31	1.23%	574	22.79%	2,519
Newton	2,328	75.41%	687	22.25%	72	2.33%	1,641	53.16%	3,087
Ouachita	3,909	52.96%	3,363	45.56%	109	1.48%	546	7.40%	7,381
Perry	2,565	69.74%	993	27.00%	120	3.26%	1,572	42.74%	3,678
Phillips	2,049	37.83%	3,256	60.11%	112	2.07%	-1,207	-22.28%	5,417
Pike	2,577	77.39%	693	20.81%	60	1.80%	1,884	56.58%	3,330
Poinsett	4,388	72.30%	1,529	25.19%	152	2.50%	2,859	47.11%	6,069
Polk	4,816	79.76%	1,043	17.27%	179	2.96%	3,773	62.49%	6,038
Pope	12,839	71.76%	4,217	23.57%	836	4.67%	8,622	48.19%	17,892
Prairie	2,063	72.39%	745	26.14%	42	1.47%	1,318	46.25%	2,850
Pulaski	51,150	38.31%	78,783	59.01%	3,743	2.68%	-27,633	-20.70%	133,505
Randolph	3,833	68.47%	1,552	27.72%	213	3.80%	2,281	40.75%	5,598
Saline	28,862	69.92%	11,193	27.11%	1,225	2.97%	17,669	42.80%	41,280
Scott	2,228	78.20%	515	18.08%	106	3.72%	1,713	60.13%	2,849
Searcy	2,432	77.72%	594	18.98%	103	3.29%	1,838	58.74%	3,129
Sebastian	21,877	66.16%	10,038	30.36%	1,150	3.48%	11,839	35.81%	33,065
Sevier	2,347	73.32%	768	23.99%	86	2.69%	1,579	49.33%	3,201
Sharp	4,203	74.15%	1,300	22.94%	165	2.91%	2,903	51.22%	5,668
St. Francis	2,496	42.90%	3,194	54.90%	128	2.20%	-698	-12.00%	5,818
Stone	3,158	71.81%	1,104	25.10%	136	3.09%	2,054	46.70%	4,398
Union	7,622	62.51%	4,235	34.73%	337	2.76%	3,387	27.78%	12,194
Van Buren	4,481	71.73%	1,552	24.84%	214	3.43%	2,929	46.89%	6,247
Washington	33,137	50.64%	30,368	46.41%	1,931	2.95%	2,769	4.23%	65,436
White	16,832	76.62%	4,552	20.72%	584	2.66%	12,280	55.90%	21,968
Woodruff	1,036	49.81%	951	45.72%	93	4.47%	85	4.09%	2,080
Yell	3,795	71.58%	1,334	25.16%	173	3.26%	2,461	46.42%	5,302
Totals	537,581	60.64%	323,644	36.51%	25,320	2.86%	213,937	24.13%	886,545

Counties that flipped from Democratic to Republican

- Monroe (largest city: Brinkley)
- Woodruff (largest city: Augusta)
