= Larry Walther =

American politician (born 1946)

40th Treasurer of Arkansas
- In office August 7, 2023 – January 1, 2025
- Governor: Sarah Huckabee Sanders
- Preceded by: Mark Lowery
- Succeeded by: John Thurston

Personal details
- Born: January 9, 1946 (age 80) San Diego, California, U.S.
- Party: Republican
- Education: Louisiana Tech University; University of Arkansas, Monticello (BS)

Larry Walther (born January 9, 1946) is an American politician who served as the 40th Treasurer of Arkansas from August 2023 to January 2025. He was appointed to the position by Governor Sarah Huckabee Sanders on August 3, 2023, after his predecessor, Mark Lowery, died of a stroke.

== Career ==
In 2003, Walther was appointed director of the Arkansas Economic Development Commission (AEDC) by then-governor Mike Huckabee.

In 2008, he was nominated and confirmed as the director of the U.S. Trade and Development Agency (USTDA) by then-president George W. Bush. In 2011, Walther served under a second president when he was nominated and confirmed to serve on the board of directors for the Export-Import Bank of the United States by Barack Obama.

In 2015, Walther was appointed Chief Fiscal Officer for the State of Arkansas and director of the state's Department of Finance and Administration.

On August 7, 2023, Walther was sworn in as the state treasurer of Arkansas. He served in the position until the 2024 elections in which John Thurston was elected to the position.

== Personal life ==
Walther's wife of 53 years, Janice, died in May 2023.

Political offices
Preceded by Mark Lowery	Treasurer of Arkansas; 2023–2025	Succeeded by John Thurston
