= John Thurston (Arkansas politician) =

American politician from Arkansas (born 1972)

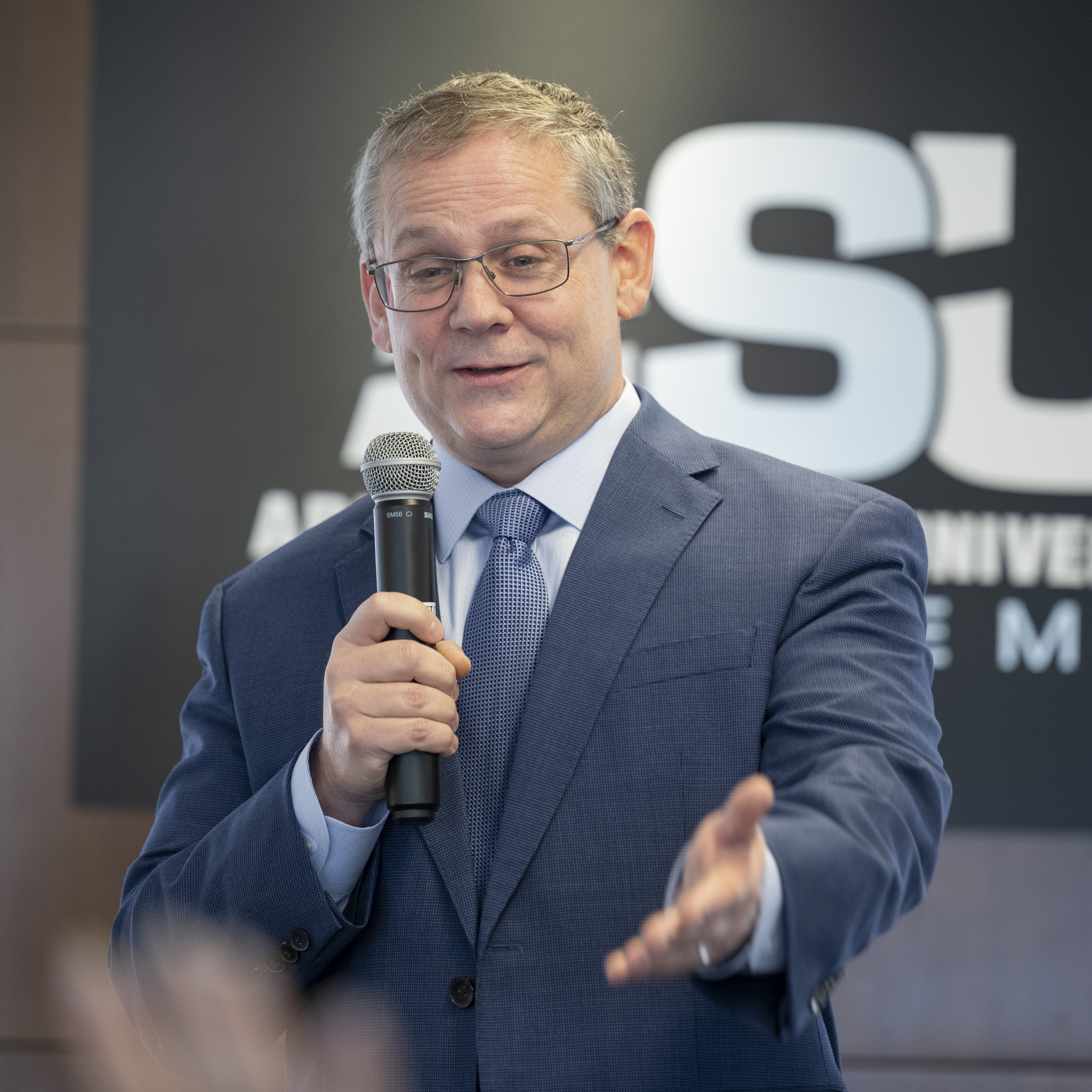
- Thurston in 2023

41st Treasurer of Arkansas
- Incumbent
- Assumed office January 1, 2025
- Governor: Sarah Huckabee Sanders
- Preceded by: Larry Walther

34th Secretary of State of Arkansas
- In office January 15, 2019 – January 1, 2025
- Governor: Asa Hutchinson; Sarah Huckabee Sanders
- Preceded by: Mark Martin
- Succeeded by: Cole Jester

Land Commissioner of Arkansas
- In office January 11, 2011 – January 15, 2019
- Governor: Mike Beebe; Asa Hutchinson
- Preceded by: Mark Wilcox
- Succeeded by: Tommy Land

Personal details
- Born: John Manuel Thurston; December 27, 1972 (age 53) Little Rock, Arkansas, U.S.
- Party: Republican
- Spouse: Joanna Thurston
- Children: 5
- Education: Henderson State University (attended); Agape College (graduated)

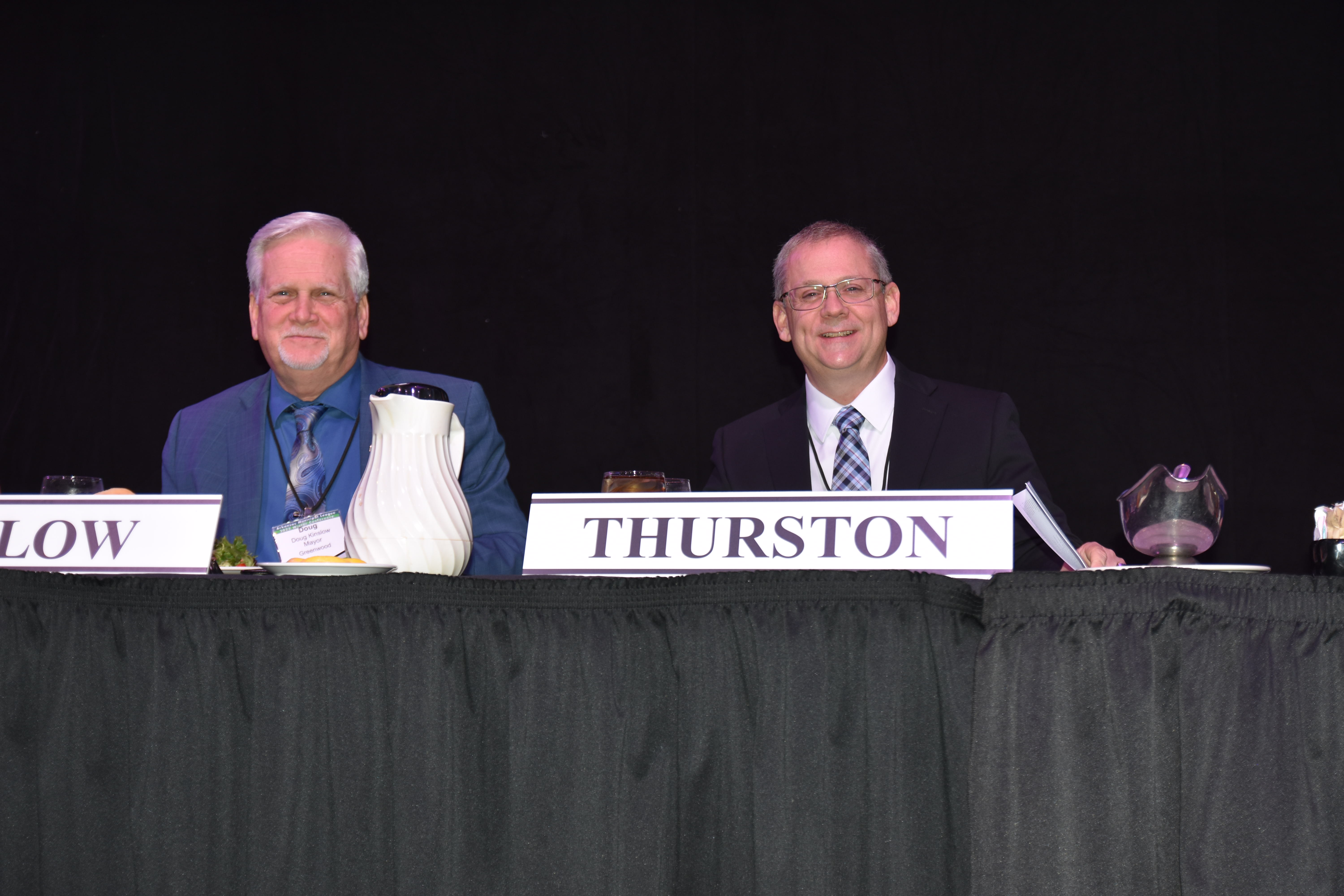
At state municipal league meeting, March 2023

John Manuel Thurston (born December 27, 1972) is an American politician who is the current State Treasurer of Arkansas; he was elected in a special election in 2024, and is running for reelection in 2026. He previously was the Secretary of State of Arkansas and Arkansas Commissioner of State Lands. A Republican, he was first elected to that position in November 2010, took office in January 2011, and was reelected in November 2014 to a second term.

== Early life ==
Thurston graduated in 1991 from Sheridan High School in Grant County in southern Arkansas. He then attended Henderson State University before graduating from Agape College in the capital city of Little Rock. Thurston was formerly a licensed Christian minister and a Certified Religious Assistant in the Arkansas state prison system. He worked 13 years for Agape Church in Little Rock before entering politics.

== Lands Commissioner ==
Thurston was the first Republican to be elected as Land Commissioner since the office became elective in 1874. In 2014, Thurston was elected as the president of the Western States Land Commissioners Association; the organization's winter conference was held in Little Rock that year.

== Arkansas Secretary of State ==
Limited to two terms as state lands commissioner, Thurston announced in June 2016 he would run in 2018 for election as Arkansas secretary of state. As important issues, he cited election security, physical security, political accessibility, and redistricting of legislative boundaries. Thurston faced Trevor Drown in the Republican primary election, and was chosen as the Republican nominee. Running against former Director of Elections, Susan Inman, as the Democratic nominee, Thurston won election on November 6, 2018, as the next Arkansas Secretary of State. Thurston won re-election on November 6, 2022.

== Controversies in office ==
=== Alleged fishing boat purchase with state funds ===
Thurston came under fire in 2018 for spending nearly $30,000 on a 18.5-foot War Eagle model 860LDSV boat for debris removal in state waterways four years prior while serving as Land Commissioner. The boat, which is designed for hunting and fishing and not debris removal, became a problem after it was discovered that it had never been used for official state business, and that Thurston had also "bought clothes to go along with it".

Critics argued it was a wasteful expense. Reports indicated that there were no records of significant inspections or findings from the boat's use, and its utility was questioned, given its limited use and lack of capacity for removing large obstacles, like the sunken barge for which at one point it was believed the boat was purchased. The issue became a focal point in Thurston's campaign for secretary of state, during which his opponent, Susan Inman, highlighted the inefficiency and wastefulness of the boat purchase.

=== Petition signature rule changes near elections ===
In the lead up to the 2024 election, Thurston, in his role as secretary of state, rejected legal petitions to add amendments to the November 5 ballot, despite various groups' coordination with his office. He cited inconsistently enforced procedures that had not been followed, and rejected ballot signatures as invalid with little transparency as to why.

==== Abortion amendment ====
In July 2024, Arkansas Secretary of State Thurston announced the rejection of petitions submitted to place an abortion rights amendment on the state's November ballot. The amendment sought to protect abortion access within the state constitution, specifically allowing abortion in cases of rape, incest, fatal fetal anomalies, or to safeguard the health of the mother within the first 18 weeks of pregnancy. However, the petitions were disqualified due to technical issues, primarily involving improper documentation regarding paid canvassers. The failure to provide necessary paperwork reduced the number of valid signatures by over 14,000, leaving the total below the required threshold of 90,704 signatures for ballot inclusion.

The group behind the petition, Arkansans for Limited Government (AFLG), had collected more than 100,000 signatures from across 54 counties. Despite their efforts, the Secretary of State's office cited non-compliance with statutory requirements because they did not identify paid canvassers by name nor provide a signed statement confirming that canvassers were given the required documents before collecting signatures.

The group believed it had submitted the paperwork properly and on time as they coordinated closely with Thurston's office throughout the entire process. Despite this, the Arkansas Supreme Court ruled 5–4 against AFLG, holding up Thurston's original claim that they had not followed procedure because they did not submit the paid canvasser training certification on time.

==== Rejection of marijuana petition signatures ====
On September 30, 2024, Thurston announced that a petition to place a medical marijuana question on the ballot did not have the number of required signatures. The petition, submitted by Arkansans for Patient Access, needed 90,704 valid signatures but only garnered 88,040. The group had initially submitted over 150,000 signatures, but nearly half of them were invalidated by Thurston and his office. The issue arose when certifications for signatures were signed by a hired canvassing company rather than the group itself. Despite the setback, the group plans to file a lawsuit, seeking to challenge the state's decision.

On October 2, 2024, the Arkansas Supreme Court overruled Thurston's decision to invalidate the signatures. He was ordered to validate roughly 18,000 signatures that he had previously invalidated.

==== Dispute over casino initiative ====
On September 23, 2024, Thurston declared that signatures on the casino initiative petition should not be counted. In his request filed with the state Supreme Court, he asked that votes for a November ballot initiative, which could revoke the Pope County casino license, not be counted. The filing argues that the procedures for gathering signatures to place the initiative on the ballot were flawed, citing uncertified and improperly paid canvassers. This aligns with a similar argument made by the current license holder, Cherokee Nation Entertainment, LLC. In contrast, the initiative's sponsor, Local Voters in Charge, contends that procedures were followed and that a special master appointed by the court confirmed sufficient valid signatures. A hearing on the issue has been expedited by the Arkansas Supreme Court.

== Electoral history ==
Results by county: Thurston: 50–60%; 60–70%; 70–80%; Bryant: 50–60%; 60–70%; 70–80%

2010 Arkansas Commissioner of State Lands election
Party	Candidate	Votes	%
Republican	John M. Thurston	396,263	52.68
Democratic	L.J. Bryant	355,996	47.32
Total votes		752,259	36.17
Republican gain from Democratic			

2014 Arkansas Commissioner of State Lands election
Party	Candidate	Votes	%
Republican	John Thurston (Incumbent)	471,848	57.17
Democratic	Mark Robertson	302,048	36.59
Libertarian	Elvis D. Presley	51,518	6.24
Majority		169,800	20.57%
Total votes		825,414	100
Republican hold			

2018 Arkansas Secretary of State election
Party	Candidate	Votes	%
Republican	John Thurston	537,581	60.64
Democratic	Susan Inman	323,644	36.51
Libertarian	Christopher Olson	25,320	2.86
Total votes		886,545	100.00
Republican hold			

2022 Arkansas Secretary of State election
Party	Candidate	Votes	%	±%
Republican	John Thurston (incumbent)	600,194	67.05	+6.41
Democratic	Anna Beth Gorman	294,970	32.95	−3.56
Total votes		895,164	100.00	N/A
Republican hold				

2024 Arkansas State Treasurer special election
Party	Candidate	Votes	%	±%
Republican	John Thurston	755,156	65.37%	–0.90
Democratic	John Pagan	350,210	30.32%	–3.41
Libertarian	Michael Pakko	49,847	4.31%	N/A
Total votes		1,155,213	100.00%	N/A
Republican hold				

Party political offices
Preceded by Dennis Wohlford	Republican nominee for Land Commissioner of Arkansas; 2010, 2014	Succeeded by Tommy Land
Preceded by Mark Martin	Republican nominee for Secretary of State of Arkansas; 2018, 2022	Succeeded by Kim Hammer
Preceded by Mark Lowery	Republican nominee for Treasurer of Arkansas; 2024, 2026	Most recent
Political offices
Preceded by Mark Wilcox	Land Commissioner of Arkansas; 2011–2019	Succeeded by Tommy Land
Preceded by Mark Martin	Secretary of State of Arkansas; 2019–2025	Succeeded by Cole Jester
Preceded by Larry Walther	Treasurer of Arkansas; 2025–present	Incumbent
