= 2008 United States presidential election in Arkansas =

- November 4, 2008

Nominee	John McCain	Barack Obama
Party	Republican	Democratic
Home state	Arizona	Illinois
Running mate	Sarah Palin	Joe Biden
Electoral vote	6	0
Popular vote	638,017	422,310
Percentage	58.72%	38.86%

McCain
40–50%
50–60%
60–70%
70–80%
80–90%
90–100%
Obama
40–50%
50–60%
60–70%
70–80%
80–90%
90–100%
Tie/no data
President before election
George W. Bush
Republican
Elected President
Barack Obama
Democratic

The 2008 United States presidential election in Arkansas took place on November 4, 2008, and was part of the 2008 United States presidential election. State voters chose six representatives, or electors, to the Electoral College, who voted for president and vice president.

Arkansas was won by Republican John McCain by a 19.86% margin of victory, a much greater margin than George W. Bush attained in 2004, despite a large national Democratic trend. Prior to the election, all 17 news organizations considered this a state McCain would win, or otherwise a red state. The state trended dramatically Republican in 2008, as McCain received over 4% more of the statewide popular vote than Bush earned in 2004 and more than doubled his margin of victory. Only five counties swung more Democratic in 2008, and the vast majority of counties swung heavily Republican, some by as much as 30%. Of the ten counties with the largest percentage swing to the Republicans in the U.S. during this election, six of them were located in Arkansas.

Obama became the first Democrat to ever win the White House without carrying Arkansas since statehood in 1836. Since 1996, Arkansas has rapidly transformed from a Democratic stronghold into one of the most Republican states in the nation. It was also one of the six states where neither Obama nor McCain won during the primary season, and the strongest of five states that swung rightward in this election. (Note: The other states are Oklahoma, Louisiana, Tennessee, and West Virginia.)

Despite McCain's landslide victory in the state's presidential race, Democratic Senator Mark Pryor easily won re-election in the senate election, in which he did not face Republican opposition, and Democrats won the popular vote and majority of House seats in the concurrent House election, in addition to majorities in both state legislative chambers. This was the first time Arkansas voted for a losing presidential candidate since 1968.

== Primaries ==
- 2008 Arkansas Democratic presidential primary
- 2008 Arkansas Republican presidential primary

== Campaign ==
=== Predictions ===
There were 16 news organizations who made state-by-state predictions of the election. Here are their last predictions before election day:

Source	Ranking
D.C. Political Report	Likely R
Cook Political Report	Solid R
The Takeaway	Lean R
Electoral-vote.com	Lean R
Washington Post	Lean R
Politico	Solid R
RealClearPolitics	Lean R
FiveThirtyEight	Solid R
CQ Politics	Solid R
The New York Times	Solid R
CNN	Lean R
NPR	Solid R
MSNBC	Solid R
Fox News	Likely R
Associated Press	Likely R
Rasmussen Reports	Safe R

=== Polling ===
John McCain won every single opinion poll taken in Arkansas prior to the election, with leads ranging from 7% to 29%. However, he polled just in the low 50% range. RealClearPolitics gave the state an average of 52.3% for McCain, compared to 38.8% for Obama. The margin of victory on election day was more than double of the RCP average. The state was not seriously contested by either campaign.

=== Fundraising ===
Obama raised $1,004,783. McCain raised $934,884. Both candidates raised the most in Pulaski County.

=== Advertising and visits ===
Obama spent over $110,350. McCain spent only $459. Neither candidate visited the state.

== Results ==
2008 United States presidential election in Arkansas
Party	Candidate	Running mate	Votes	Percentage	Electoral votes
Republican	John McCain	Sarah Palin	638,017	58.72%	6
Democratic	Barack Obama	Joe Biden	422,310	38.86%	0
Independent	Ralph Nader	Matt Gonzalez	12,882	1.19%	0
Libertarian	Bob Barr	Wayne Allyn Root	4,776	0.44%	0
Constitution	Chuck Baldwin	Darrell Castle	4,023	0.37%	0
Green	Cynthia McKinney	Rosa Clemente	3,470	0.32%	0
Socialism and Liberation	Gloria La Riva	Eugene Puryear	1,139	0.10%	0
Totals			1,086,617	100.00%	6
Voter turnout				64.52%	

=== By county ===
County	John McCain Republican		Barack Obama Democratic		Various candidates Other parties		Margin		Total
County	#	%	#	%	#	%	#	%	Total
Arkansas	4,185	59.97%	2,619	37.53%	174	2.49%	1,566	22.44%	6,978
Ashley	5,406	62.55%	2,976	34.44%	260	3.01%	2,430	28.11%	8,642
Baxter	12,852	64.32%	6,539	32.73%	590	2.95%	6,313	31.59%	19,981
Benton	51,124	67.20%	23,331	30.67%	1,618	2.13%	27,793	36.53%	76,073
Boone	10,575	68.34%	4,435	28.66%	464	3.00%	6,140	39.68%	15,474
Bradley	2,262	55.98%	1,680	41.57%	99	2.45%	582	14.41%	4,041
Calhoun	1,462	65.94%	691	31.17%	64	2.89%	771	34.77%	2,217
Carroll	6,083	57.50%	4,172	39.44%	324	3.06%	1,911	18.06%	10,579
Chicot	2,119	40.69%	3,043	58.43%	46	0.88%	-924	-17.74%	5,208
Clark	4,608	50.67%	4,267	46.92%	219	2.41%	341	3.75%	9,094
Clay	3,032	55.02%	2,244	40.72%	235	4.26%	788	14.30%	5,511
Cleburne	7,962	70.22%	2,951	26.03%	425	3.75%	5,011	44.19%	11,338
Cleveland	2,451	69.93%	911	25.99%	143	4.08%	1,540	43.94%	3,505
Columbia	5,861	61.32%	3,554	37.18%	143	1.50%	2,307	24.14%	9,558
Conway	4,691	57.64%	3,149	38.70%	298	3.66%	1,542	18.94%	8,138
Craighead	18,881	60.97%	11,294	36.47%	793	2.56%	7,587	24.50%	30,968
Crawford	14,688	71.54%	5,238	25.51%	606	2.95%	9,450	46.03%	20,532
Crittenden	7,650	41.91%	10,330	56.59%	275	1.51%	-2,680	-14.68%	18,255
Cross	4,393	61.61%	2,580	36.19%	157	2.20%	1,813	25.42%	7,130
Dallas	1,757	52.95%	1,471	44.33%	90	2.71%	286	8.62%	3,318
Desha	1,999	42.73%	2,569	54.92%	110	2.35%	-570	-12.19%	4,678
Drew	3,860	58.40%	2,598	39.30%	152	2.30%	1,262	19.10%	6,610
Faulkner	25,362	61.59%	14,955	36.32%	862	2.10%	10,407	25.27%	41,179
Franklin	4,411	68.12%	1,869	28.86%	195	3.01%	2,542	39.26%	6,475
Fulton	2,702	57.78%	1,819	38.90%	155	3.31%	883	18.88%	4,676
Garland	26,825	61.36%	15,899	36.37%	995	2.28%	10,926	24.99%	43,719
Grant	5,023	73.94%	1,562	22.99%	208	3.06%	3,461	50.95%	6,793
Greene	8,578	63.02%	4,541	33.36%	493	3.62%	4,037	29.66%	13,612
Hempstead	4,273	58.14%	2,869	39.04%	207	2.82%	1,404	19.10%	7,349
Hot Spring	7,209	60.30%	4,288	35.87%	458	3.83%	2,921	24.43%	11,955
Howard	2,957	61.02%	1,746	36.03%	143	2.95%	1,211	24.99%	4,846
Independence	8,255	67.12%	3,688	29.99%	356	2.89%	4,567	37.13%	12,299
Izard	3,193	61.19%	1,792	34.34%	233	4.47%	1,401	26.85%	5,218
Jackson	3,118	55.86%	2,207	39.54%	257	4.60%	911	16.32%	5,582
Jefferson	10,655	35.89%	18,465	62.19%	569	1.92%	-7,810	-26.30%	29,689
Johnson	4,922	60.17%	3,034	37.09%	224	2.74%	1,888	23.08%	8,180
Lafayette	1,685	58.06%	1,133	39.04%	84	2.89%	552	19.02%	2,902
Lawrence	3,357	57.58%	2,138	36.67%	335	5.75%	1,219	20.91%	5,830
Lee	1,454	38.64%	2,263	60.14%	46	1.22%	-809	-21.50%	3,763
Lincoln	2,513	57.04%	1,710	38.81%	183	4.15%	803	18.23%	4,406
Little River	3,247	63.02%	1,753	34.03%	152	2.95%	1,494	28.99%	5,152
Logan	5,350	67.66%	2,286	28.91%	271	3.43%	3,064	38.75%	7,907
Lonoke	17,242	72.63%	5,968	25.14%	531	2.24%	11,274	47.49%	23,741
Madison	3,972	62.77%	2,144	33.88%	212	3.35%	1,828	28.89%	6,328
Marion	4,524	63.17%	2,384	33.29%	254	3.55%	2,140	29.88%	7,162
Miller	9,913	65.81%	4,869	32.32%	281	1.87%	5,044	33.49%	15,063
Mississippi	6,976	49.79%	6,667	47.59%	367	2.62%	309	2.20%	14,010
Monroe	1,754	50.86%	1,615	46.83%	80	2.32%	139	4.03%	3,449
Montgomery	2,365	65.30%	1,092	30.15%	165	4.56%	1,273	35.15%	3,622
Nevada	2,062	56.73%	1,474	40.55%	99	2.72%	588	16.18%	3,635
Newton	2,588	65.35%	1,182	29.85%	190	4.80%	1,406	35.50%	3,960
Ouachita	5,427	54.49%	4,346	43.63%	187	1.88%	1,081	10.86%	9,960
Perry	2,743	64.10%	1,352	31.60%	184	4.30%	1,391	32.50%	4,279
Phillips	3,097	34.53%	5,695	63.50%	177	1.97%	-2,598	-28.97%	8,969
Pike	2,727	68.76%	1,089	27.46%	150	3.78%	1,638	41.30%	3,966
Poinsett	4,903	61.84%	2,742	34.59%	283	3.57%	2,161	27.25%	7,928
Polk	5,473	71.25%	1,957	25.48%	251	3.27%	3,516	45.77%	7,681
Pope	15,568	70.51%	6,002	27.18%	509	2.31%	9,566	43.33%	22,079
Prairie	2,223	65.75%	1,048	31.00%	110	3.25%	1,175	34.75%	3,381
Pulaski	70,212	43.52%	88,854	55.07%	2,277	1.41%	-18,642	-11.55%	161,343
Randolph	3,615	57.21%	2,469	39.07%	235	3.72%	1,146	18.14%	6,319
St. Francis	3,917	41.21%	5,486	57.72%	102	1.08%	-1,569	-16.51%	9,505
Saline	30,981	69.38%	12,695	28.43%	977	2.19%	18,286	40.95%	44,653
Scott	2,791	69.86%	1,053	26.36%	151	3.78%	1,738	43.50%	3,995
Searcy	2,726	70.86%	961	24.98%	160	4.16%	1,765	45.88%	3,847
Sebastian	28,637	66.27%	13,673	31.64%	902	2.09%	14,964	34.63%	43,212
Sevier	3,125	68.23%	1,291	28.19%	164	3.58%	1,834	40.04%	4,580
Sharp	4,535	62.53%	2,436	33.59%	281	3.87%	2,099	28.94%	7,252
Stone	3,534	66.38%	1,598	30.02%	192	3.61%	1,936	36.36%	5,324
Union	10,677	62.15%	6,190	36.03%	312	3.61%	4,487	26.12%	17,179
Van Buren	4,276	63.79%	2,151	32.09%	276	4.12%	2,125	31.70%	6,703
Washington	37,963	55.52%	29,021	42.44%	1,396	2.04%	8,942	13.08%	68,380
White	19,467	72.22%	6,732	24.97%	756	2.80%	12,735	47.25%	26,955
Woodruff	1,206	43.68%	1,412	51.14%	143	5.18%	-206	-7.46%	2,761
Yell	3,808	63.09%	2,003	33.18%	225	3.73%	1,805	29.91%	6,036
Totals	638,017	58.72%	422,310	38.86%	26,290	2.42%	215,707	19.86%	1,086,617

Counties that flipped from Democratic to Republican

- Bradley (largest city: Warren)
- Clark (largest city: Arkadelphia)
- Clay (largest city: Piggott)
- Hempstead (largest city: Hope)
- Jackson (largest city: Newport)
- Lawrence (largest city: Walnut Ridge)
- Lincoln (largest city: Star City)
- Little River (largest city: Ashdown)
- Mississippi (largest city: Osceola)
- Monroe (largest city: Clarendon)
- Poinsett (largest city: Harrisburg)
- Randolph (largest city: Pocahontas)

=== By congressional district ===
McCain won all four congressional district in Arkansas, three of which were held by Democrats.

District	McCain	Obama	Representative
1st	58.69%	38.41%	Marion Berry
2nd	53.98%	44.07%	Vic Snyder
3rd	64.16%	33.45%	John Boozman
4th	58.14%	39.33%	Michael Avery Ross

== Electors ==
Technically the voters of Arkansas cast their ballots for electors: representatives to the Electoral College. Arkansas is allocated six electors because it has four congressional districts and two senators. All candidates who appear on the ballot or qualify to receive write-in votes must submit a list of six electors, who pledge to vote for their candidate and their running mate. Whoever wins the majority of votes in the state is awarded all six electoral votes. Their chosen electors then vote for president and vice president. Although electors are pledged to their candidate and running mate, they are not obligated to vote for them. An elector who votes for someone other than their candidate is known as a faithless elector.

The electors of each state and the District of Columbia met on December 15, 2008, to cast their votes for president and vice president. The Electoral College itself never meets as one body. Instead, the electors from each state and the District of Columbia met in their respective capitols.

The following were the members of the Electoral College from the state. All six were pledged to John McCain and Sarah Palin:

1. Jim Burnett
2. Reta Hamilton
3. Rose Bryant Jones
4. Phyllis Kincannon
5. Steve Lux
6. Kermit Parks

== Analysis ==
Although former President Bill Clinton, a Democrat, easily carried his home state of Arkansas in 1992 and 1996, the state was largely considered a safe state for McCain. Early polls gave McCain a 9-point lead among possible voters on Election Day. Although the state was still strongly Democratic at the non-presidential levels, on Election Day, Arkansas voted for McCain by a margin of approximately 20% — ten points better than Bush's showing four years earlier. In this election, Arkansas voted 27.12% to the right of the nation at large.

A handful of counties swung safely into the GOP column. Jackson, Lincoln, and Clark counties voted Republican for the first time since in 1972. Bradley, Clay, Monroe, Poinsett, Randolph, and Little River counties did so for the first time since 1984, while Hempstead, Mississippi, and Lawrence counties did so for the first time since 1988. The Delta county of Jackson, for example, swung from a 14.3-point victory for Democrat Kerry in 2004 to a 16.3-point victory for McCain in 2008. Possible factors suggested for such a large swing away from the Democrats was Obama's status as the first African American major-party nominee in a historically segregationist state still dominated by conservative whites, as well as the fact that Hillary Clinton, who once served as First Lady of Arkansas while her husband was Governor, did not receive the Democratic presidential nomination in 2008. Polling from the Spring showed Hillary Clinton defeating McCain in a hypothetical match-up in Arkansas. Obama became the first Democrat in history to win the White House without carrying Arkansas.

During the same election, however, freshman Democratic U.S. Senator Mark Pryor faced no Republican opposition, and was reelected in a landslide victory over Rebekah Kennedy of the Green Party. The four members of the state's delegation to the U.S. House of Representatives (three Democrats and one Republican) were also reelected with no major-party opposition. Republicans, however, picked up three seats in the Arkansas House of Representatives and one Democratic state representative became a Green (he later returned to the Democratic Party in 2009).

== See also ==
- United States presidential elections in Arkansas
- Presidency of Barack Obama
