= Arkansas's 1st congressional district =

U.S. House district for Arkansas

Coordinates: 35°17′38″N 91°15′30″W

- Interactive map of district boundaries since January 3, 2023
- Representative: Rick Crawford; R–Jonesboro
- Area: 17,521 mi^{2} (45,380 km^{2})
- Distribution: 55.5% rural; 44.5% urban
- Population (2025): 753,764
- Median household income: $56,392
- Ethnicity: 73.3% White; 17.3% Black; 4.2% Two or more races; 3.9% Hispanic; 0.7% Asian; 0.7% other
- Occupation: 48.8% White-collar; 35% Blue-collar; 16.2% Gray-collar
- Cook PVI: R+23

Arkansas's 1st congressional district is a U.S. congressional district in eastern Arkansas that elects a representative to the United States House of Representatives. It is currently represented by Republican Rick Crawford. With a Cook Partisan Voting Index rating of R+23, it is the most Republican district in Arkansas, a state with an all-Republican congressional delegation.

== Political history ==
The Mississippi Delta became dominated by industrial agriculture in the 20th century, with cotton, rice, and soybeans by far the biggest exports from the region. The 1st District covers most of the Arkansas Delta area and stretches as far west as the Ozarks. The farming areas, despite their fertility, are generally poor by national standards. Jobs are limited and unemployment and undereducation are major issues. Rice farms receive substantial subsidies from the federal farming program. Three of the top five subsidy farms in the United States are in this district, and they have received more than $100 million since 1996.

Some manufacturing has taken place in the region recently. Several auto parts factories were built in Marion, and Toyota has considered it as the site for its seventh North American plant. Jonesboro is the largest city. It is home to a sizable food processing industry, with companies such as Nestle and Frito-Lay sited here. Jonesboro is also home to Arkansas State University (ASU)-Jonesboro. While Jonesboro is dominated by conservative white Republican voters, as are some of the hill counties, African Americans in the Mississippi River Delta are committed Democratic voters. The district is the second poorest congressional district in Arkansas, with a median household income of $52,119, per a 2024 study.

Until recently, this district makeup resulted in a fairly closely divided vote in national politics. However, the district has been swept up in the growing Republican trend in Arkansas, especially as the Delta's population has plummeted. While Al Gore narrowly carried the district in 2000 with 50% of the vote, George W. Bush won the district in 2004. The district swung even more Republican in 2008, giving John McCain 58.69% of the vote while Barack Obama received 38.41% here. The Republican vote has steadily increased since then with Donald Trump tallying 65 percent of the vote in 2016, his best showing in the state.

== Geography ==
=== 2003–2013 ===
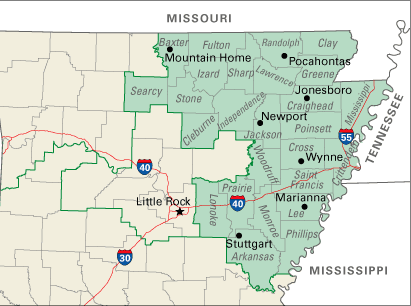
The district from 2003 to 2013

Before the 2010 census, the 1st district represented portions of northeastern Arkansas, encompassing the counties of Arkansas, Baxter, Clay, Cleburne, Craighead, Crittenden, Cross, Fulton, Greene, Independence, Izard, Jackson, Lawrence, Lee, Lonoke, Mississippi, Monroe, Phillips, Poinsett, Prairie, Randolph, Saint Francis, Searcy, Sharp, Stone, and Woodruff.

=== 2013–2023 ===
The district was redesigned to take in additional counties in the southeastern portion that were part of the 4th district which in turn took the entire eastern Arkansas border. It is now more than 76% white, and they support Republican presidential candidates.

The district fully encompasses the counties of Arkansas, Baxter, Chicot, Clay, Cleburne, Craighead, Crittenden, Cross, Desha, Fulton, Greene, Independence, Izard, Jackson, Lawrence, Lee, Lincoln, Lonoke, Mississippi, Monroe, Phillips, Poinsett, Prairie, Randolph, Saint Francis, Sharp, Stone, and Woodruff. The district also encompasses parts of Jefferson and Searcy counties.

=== 2023–present ===
The 1st district now includes the entirety of the following counties, with the exception of Pulaski, which it shares with the 2nd and 4th districts. The only Pulaski County municipalities located in the 1st district are Scott (which is partially located in Lonoke County) and North Little Rock, portions of which are also found in the 2nd district.

#	County	Seat	Population
1	Arkansas	Stuttgart, DeWitt	16,307
5	Baxter	Mountain Home	42,875
9	Boone	Harrison	38,530
17	Chicot	Lake Village	9,538
21	Clay	Piggott, Corning	14,201
31	Craighead	Jonesboro, Lake City	113,993
35	Crittenden	Marion	47,139
37	Cross	Wynne	16,420
41	Desha	Arkansas City	10,479
49	Fulton	Salem	12,421
55	Greene	Paragould	46,743
63	Independence	Batesville	38,320
65	Izard	Melbourne	14,169
67	Jackson	Newport	16,784
75	Lawrence	Walnut Ridge	16,318
77	Lee	Marianna	8,201
79	Lincoln	Star City	12,898
85	Lonoke	Lonoke	75,944
89	Marion	Yellville	17,514
93	Mississippi	Blytheville, Osceola	38,663
95	Monroe	Clarendon	6,512
107	Phillips	Helena-West Helena	14,961
111	Poinsett	Harrisburg	22,397
117	Prairie	Des Arc, DeValls Bluff	8,036
119	Pulaski (shared with 2nd and 4th districts)	Little Rock	400,009
121	Randolph	Pocahontas	18,907
123	St. Francis	Forrest City	22,101
129	Searcy	Marshall	7,806
135	Sharp	Ash Flat	17,968
137	Stone	Mountain View	12,671
147	Woodruff	Augusta	5,964

== Recent election results from statewide races ==
Year	Office	Results
2008	President	McCain 58% - 39%
2012	President	Romney 63% - 37%
2016	President	Trump 65% - 30%
2016	Senate	Boozman 64% - 32%
2018	Governor	Hutchinson 69% - 28%
2018	Lt. Governor	Griffin 68% - 29%
2018	Attorney General	Rutledge 66% - 31%
2020	President	Trump 69% - 28%
2022	Senate	Boozman 72% - 25%
2022	Governor	Huckabee Sanders 70% - 28%
2022	Lt. Governor	Rutledge 71% - 25%
2022	Attorney General	Griffin 74% - 26%
2022	Secretary of State	Thurston 73% - 27%
2022	Treasurer	Lowery 73% - 27%
2022	Auditor	Milligan 72% - 24%
2024	President	Trump 72% - 26%
2024	Treasurer (Spec.)	Thurston 72% - 24%
2026	Senate	Cotton 61% - 34%
2026	Governor	Huckabee Sanders 61% - 31%

== List of members representing the district ==
The district was created in 1853 after the 1850 United States census added a second seat to the state. The at-large seat then was split between this district and the second district.

Member	Party	Year	Cong ress	Electoral history	Location
District created March 4, 1853
Alfred B. Greenwood (Bentonville)	Democratic	March 4, 1853 – March 3, 1859	33rd 34th 35th	Elected in 1853. Re-elected in 1854. Re-elected in 1856. Retired.	
Thomas C. Hindman (Helena)	Democratic	March 4, 1859 – March 3, 1861	36th	Elected in 1858. Re-elected in 1860 but resigned due to Civil War.	
Vacant		March 4, 1861 – June 22, 1868	37th 38th 39th 40th	Civil War and Reconstruction	
Logan H. Roots (Duvalls Bluff)	Republican	June 22, 1868 – March 3, 1871	40th 41st	Elected in 1868 to finish term. Re-elected in 1868. Lost re-election.	
James M. Hanks (Helena)	Democratic	March 4, 1871 – March 3, 1873	42nd	Elected in 1870. Retired.	
Asa Hodges (Marion)	Republican	March 4, 1873 – March 3, 1875	43rd	Elected in 1872. Retired.	
Lucien C. Gause (Jacksonport)	Democratic	March 4, 1875 – March 3, 1879	44th 45th	Elected in 1874. Re-elected in 1876. Retired.	
Poindexter Dunn (Forrest City)	Democratic	March 4, 1879 – March 3, 1889	46th 47th 48th 49th 50th	Elected in 1878. Re-elected in 1880. Re-elected in 1882. Re-elected in 1884. Re-elected in 1886. Retired.	
William H. Cate (Jonesboro)	Democratic	March 4, 1889 – March 5, 1890	51st	Elected in 1888. Lost contested election.	
Lewis P. Featherstone (Forrest City)	Labor	March 5, 1890 – March 3, 1891	51st	Successfully contested William H. Cate's 1888 election. Lost re-election.	
William H. Cate (Jonesboro)	Democratic	March 4, 1891 – March 3, 1893	52nd	Elected in 1890. Retired.	
Philip D. McCulloch Jr. (Marianna)	Democratic	March 4, 1893 – March 3, 1903	53rd 54th 55th 56th 57th	Elected in 1892. Re-elected in 1894. Re-elected in 1896. Re-elected in 1898. Re-elected in 1900. Retired.	
Robert B. Macon (Helena)	Democratic	March 4, 1903 – March 3, 1913	58th 59th 60th 61st 62nd	Elected in 1902. Re-elected in 1904. Re-elected in 1906. Re-elected in 1908. Re-elected in 1910. Lost renomination.	
Thaddeus H. Caraway (Jonesboro)	Democratic	March 4, 1913 – March 3, 1921	63rd 64th 65th 66th	Elected in 1912. Re-elected in 1914. Re-elected in 1916. Re-elected in 1918. Retired to run for U.S. senator.	
William J. Driver (Osceola)	Democratic	March 4, 1921 – January 3, 1939	67th 68th 69th 70th 71st 72nd 73rd 74th 75th	Elected in 1920. Re-elected in 1922. Re-elected in 1924. Re-elected in 1926. Re-elected in 1928. Re-elected in 1930. Re-elected in 1932. Re-elected in 1934. Re-elected in 1936. Lost renomination.	
Ezekiel C. Gathings (West Memphis)	Democratic	January 3, 1939 – January 3, 1969	76th 77th 78th 79th 80th 81st 82nd 83rd 84th 85th 86th 87th 88th 89th 90th	Elected in 1938. Re-elected in 1940. Re-elected in 1942. Re-elected in 1944. Re-elected in 1946. Re-elected in 1948. Re-elected in 1950. Re-elected in 1952. Re-elected in 1954. Re-elected in 1956. Re-elected in 1958. Re-elected in 1960. Re-elected in 1962. Re-elected in 1964. Re-elected in 1966. Retired.	
Bill Alexander (Osceola)	Democratic	January 3, 1969 – January 3, 1993	91st 92nd 93rd 94th 95th 96th 97th 98th 99th 100th 101st 102nd	Elected in 1968. Re-elected in 1970. Re-elected in 1972. Re-elected in 1974. Re-elected in 1976. Re-elected in 1978. Re-elected in 1980. Re-elected in 1982. Re-elected in 1984. Re-elected in 1986. Re-elected in 1988. Re-elected in 1990. Lost renomination.	
Blanche Lincoln (Helena)	Democratic	January 3, 1993 – January 3, 1997	103rd 104th	Elected in 1992. Re-elected in 1994. Retired.	1993–2003 [data missing]
Marion Berry (Gillett)	Democratic	January 3, 1997 – January 3, 2011	105th 106th 107th 108th 109th 110th 111th	Elected in 1996. Re-elected in 1998. Re-elected in 2000. Re-elected in 2002. Re-elected in 2004. Re-elected in 2006. Re-elected in 2008. Retired.	1993–2003 [data missing]
Marion Berry (Gillett)	Democratic	January 3, 1997 – January 3, 2011	105th 106th 107th 108th 109th 110th 111th	Elected in 1996. Re-elected in 1998. Re-elected in 2000. Re-elected in 2002. Re-elected in 2004. Re-elected in 2006. Re-elected in 2008. Retired.	2003–2013
Rick Crawford (Jonesboro)	Republican	January 3, 2011 – present	112th 113th 114th 115th 116th 117th 118th 119th	Elected in 2010. Re-elected in 2012. Re-elected in 2014. Re-elected in 2016. Re-elected in 2018. Re-elected in 2020. Re-elected in 2022. Re-elected in 2024. Re-elected in 2026.	2003–2013
Rick Crawford (Jonesboro)	Republican	January 3, 2011 – present	112th 113th 114th 115th 116th 117th 118th 119th	Elected in 2010. Re-elected in 2012. Re-elected in 2014. Re-elected in 2016. Re-elected in 2018. Re-elected in 2020. Re-elected in 2022. Re-elected in 2024. Re-elected in 2026.	2013–2023
Rick Crawford (Jonesboro)	Republican	January 3, 2011 – present	112th 113th 114th 115th 116th 117th 118th 119th	Elected in 2010. Re-elected in 2012. Re-elected in 2014. Re-elected in 2016. Re-elected in 2018. Re-elected in 2020. Re-elected in 2022. Re-elected in 2024. Re-elected in 2026.	2023–present

== Recent election results ==
=== 2002 ===
2002 Arkansas's 1st congressional district election
Party	Candidate	Votes	%	±%
Democratic	Robert Marion Berry*	129,701	67%	
Republican	Tommy F. Robinson	64,357	33%	
Majority		65,344	33%	
Total votes		194,058	100.00	
Democratic hold				

=== 2004 ===
2004 Arkansas's 1st congressional district election
Party	Candidate	Votes	%	±%
Democratic	Robert Marion Berry*	162,388	67%	
Republican	Vernon Humphrey	81,556	33%	
Majority		80,832	33%	
Total votes		243,944	100.00	
Democratic hold				

=== 2006 ===
2006 Arkansas's 1st congressional district election
Party	Candidate	Votes	%	±%
Democratic	Robert Marion Berry*	127,577	69%	▲2%
Republican	Mickey Stumbaugh	56,611	31%	
Majority		70,966	39%	
Total votes		184,188	100.00%	
Democratic hold				

=== 2008 ===
2008 Arkansas's 1st congressional district election
Party	Candidate	Votes	%	±%
Democratic	Robert Marion Berry*	124,304	100%	▲31%
Majority			100%	
Total votes		124,304	100%	
Democratic hold				

=== 2010 ===
2010 Arkansas's 1st congressional district election
Party	Candidate	Votes	%	±%
Republican	Rick Crawford	93,224	52%	▼48%
Democratic	Chad Causey	78,267	43%	
Green	Ken Adler	8,320	5%	
Write-In	Write-ins	205	0.11%	
Majority		14,957	9%	
Total votes		180,016	100.00%	
Republican gain from Democratic				

=== 2012 ===
2012 Arkansas's 1st congressional district election
Party	Candidate	Votes	%	±%
Republican	Rick Crawford (Incumbent)	138,800	56%	▲4%
Democratic	Scott Ellington	96,601	39%	
Libertarian	Jessica Paxton	6,427	3%	
Green	Jacob Holloway	5,015	2%	
Majority		42,199	17.10%	
Total votes		246,843	100.00%	
Republican hold				

=== 2014 ===
2014 Arkansas's 1st congressional district election
Party	Candidate	Votes	%	±%
Republican	Rick Crawford (Incumbent)	124,139	63%	▲7%
Democratic	Jackie McPherson	63,555	32%	
Libertarian	Brian Scott Willhite	8,562	5%	
Majority		60,584	31%	
Total votes		196,256	100.00%	
Republican hold				

=== 2016 ===
2016 Arkansas's 1st congressional district election
Party	Candidate	Votes	%	±%
Republican	Rick Crawford (Incumbent)	183,866	76.28%	▲13.28%
Libertarian	Mark West	57,181	23.72%	
Majority		126,685	52.56%	
Total votes		241,047	100.00%	
Republican hold				

=== 2018 ===
The 2018 election was held on November 6, 2018.

2018 Arkansas's 1st congressional district election
Party	Candidate	Votes	%
Republican	Rick Crawford (Incumbent)	138,757	68.9
Democratic	Chintan Desai	57,907	28.8
Libertarian	Elvis Presley	4,581	2.3
Total votes		201,245	100.0
Republican hold			

=== 2020 ===
2020 Arkansas's 1st congressional district election
Party	Candidate	Votes	%
Republican	Rick Crawford (Incumbent)	237,596	100.0
Total votes		237,596	100.0
Republican hold			

=== 2022 ===
2022 Arkansas's 1st congressional district election
Party	Candidate	Votes	%
Republican	Rick Crawford (Incumbent)	153,774	73.80
Democratic	Monte Hodges	54,598	26.20
Total votes		208,372	100
Republican hold			

=== 2024 ===
2024 Arkansas's 1st congressional district election
Party	Candidate	Votes	%
Republican	Rick Crawford (incumbent)	194,435	72.9
Democratic	Rodney Govens	63,917	24.0
Libertarian	Steve Parsons	8,337	3.1
Total votes		266,689	100
Republican hold			

== See also ==
- United States House of Representatives elections in Arkansas, 2010
