= 2002 United States House of Representatives elections in Arkansas =

- November 5, 2002

All 4 Arkansas seats to the United States House of Representatives
	Majority party	Minority party
Party	Democratic	Republican
Last election	3	1
Seats won	3	1
Seat change	Steady	Steady
Popular vote	392,086	283,739
Percentage	56.96%	41.22%

Democratic
50–60%
60–70%
70–80%
>90%
Republican
50–60%
90–100%
No Vote

The United States House of Representatives elections in Arkansas occurred on November 5, 2002 to elect the members of the State of Arkansas's delegation to the United States House of Representatives. Arkansas had four seats in the House, apportioned according to the 2000 United States census.

These elections were held concurrently with the United States Senate elections of 2002 (including one in Arkansas), the United States House elections in other states, and various state and local elections.

== Overview ==
United States House of Representatives elections in Arkansas, 2002
Party	Votes	Percentage	Seats before	Seats after	+/–
Democratic	392,086	56.96%	3	3	±0
Republican	283,739	41.22%	1	1	±0
Others	12,451	1.81%	0	0	
Totals	688,276	100.00%	4	4	-

== Results ==
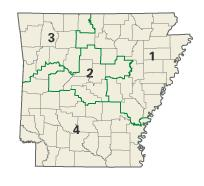
Arkansas congressional districts in the 2002 elections

District	Incumbent	Party	First elected	Result	Candidates
Arkansas 1	Marion Berry	Democratic	1996	Re-elected	Marion Berry (D) 66.84% Tommy F. Robinson (R) 33.16%
Arkansas 2	Vic Snyder	Democratic	1996	Re-elected	Vic Snyder (D) 92.92% Ed Garner (Write-in) 7.08%
Arkansas 3	John Boozman	Republican	2001	Re-elected	John Boozman (R) 98.90% George "Ozone" Lyne (Write-in) 1.10%
Arkansas 4	Mike Ross	Democratic	2000	Re-elected	Mike Ross (D) 60.56% Jay Dickey (R) 39.44%

== District 1 ==
2002 Arkansas's 1st congressional district election
- November 5, 2002
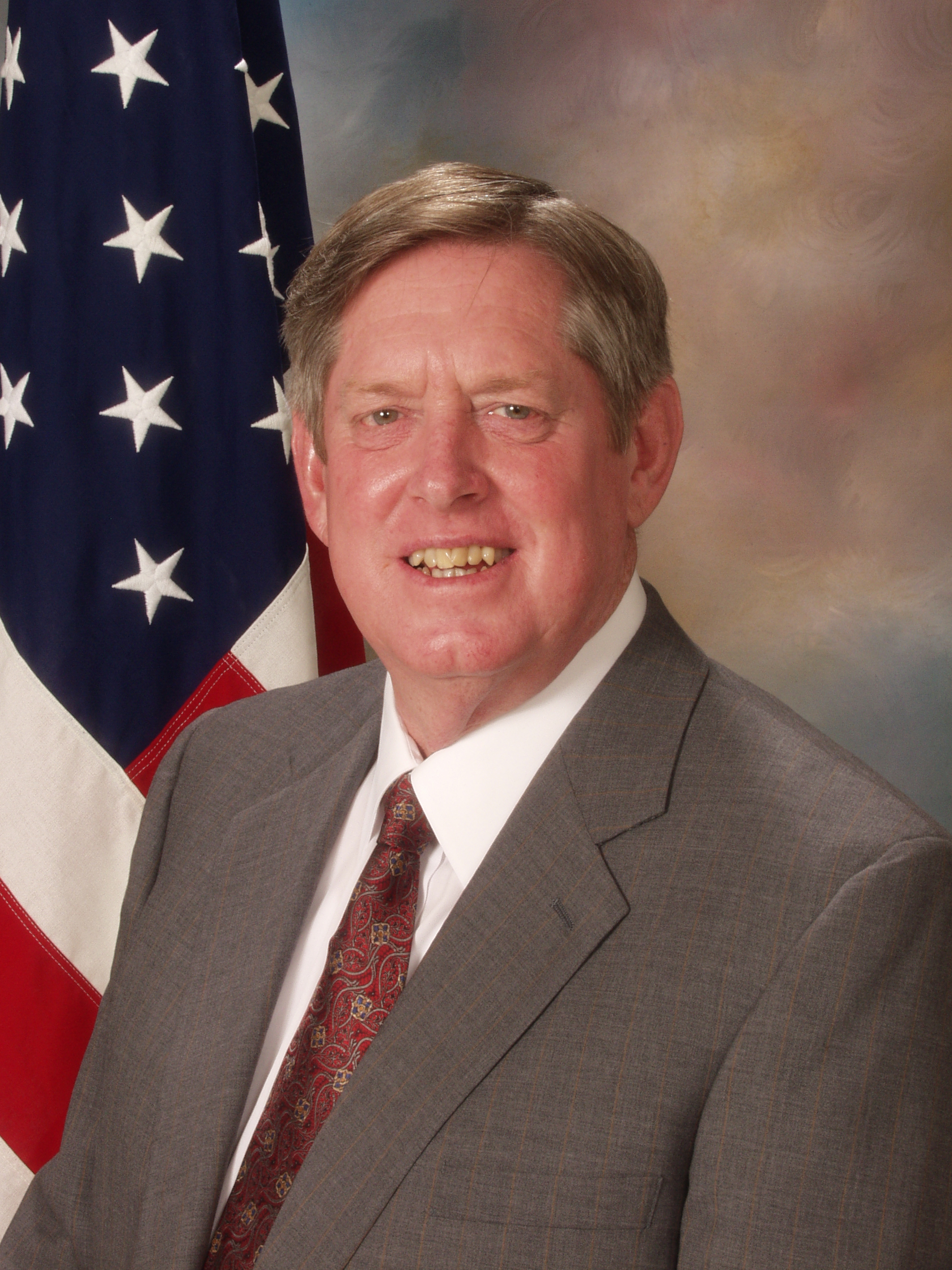

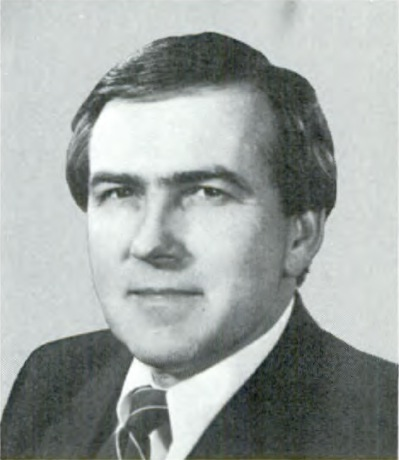
Nominee	Marion Berry	Tommy F. Robinson
Party	Democratic	Republican
Popular vote	129,701	64,357
Percentage	66.8%	33.2%
- County results Berry: 50–60% 60–70% 70–80% 80–90% Robinson: 50–60%
U.S. Representative before election
Marion Berry
Democratic
Elected U.S. Representative
Marion Berry
Democratic

Incumbent Democrat Marion Berry, who was first elected in 1996, ran for re-election. Berry was re-elected with 66.8% of the vote.

=== General election ===
==== Results ====
Arkansas's 1st congressional district election, 2002
Party	Candidate	Votes	%
Democratic	Marion Berry (incumbent)	129,701	66.8
Republican	Tommy F. Robinson	64,357	33.2
Total votes		194,058	100.0
Democratic hold			

== District 2 ==
2002 Arkansas's 2nd congressional district election
- November 5, 2002
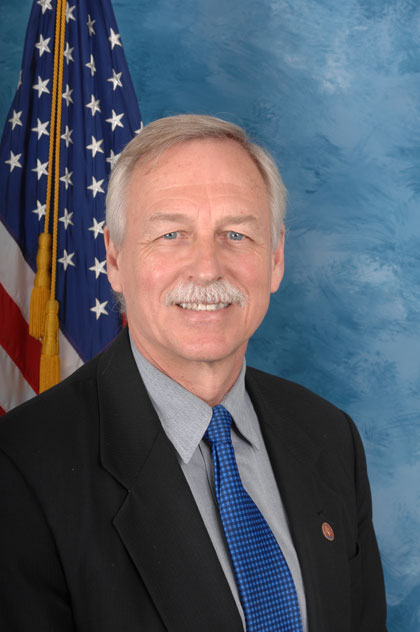

Nominee	Vic Snyder	Ed Garner
Party	Democratic	Write-In
Popular vote	142,752	10,874
Percentage	92.9%	7.1%
- County results Snyder: 80–90% 90–100%
U.S. Representative before election
Vic Snyder
Democratic
Elected U.S. Representative
Vic Snyder
Democratic

Incumbent Democrat Vic Snyder, who was first elected in 1996, ran for re-election. Snyder was re-elected with 92.9% of the vote.

=== General election ===
==== Results ====
Arkansas's 2nd congressional district election, 2002
Party	Candidate	Votes	%
Democratic	Vic Snyder (incumbent)	142,752	92.9
Write-In	Ed Garner	10,874	7.1
Total votes		153,626	100.0
Democratic hold			

== District 3 ==
2002 Arkansas's 3rd congressional district election
- November 5, 2002
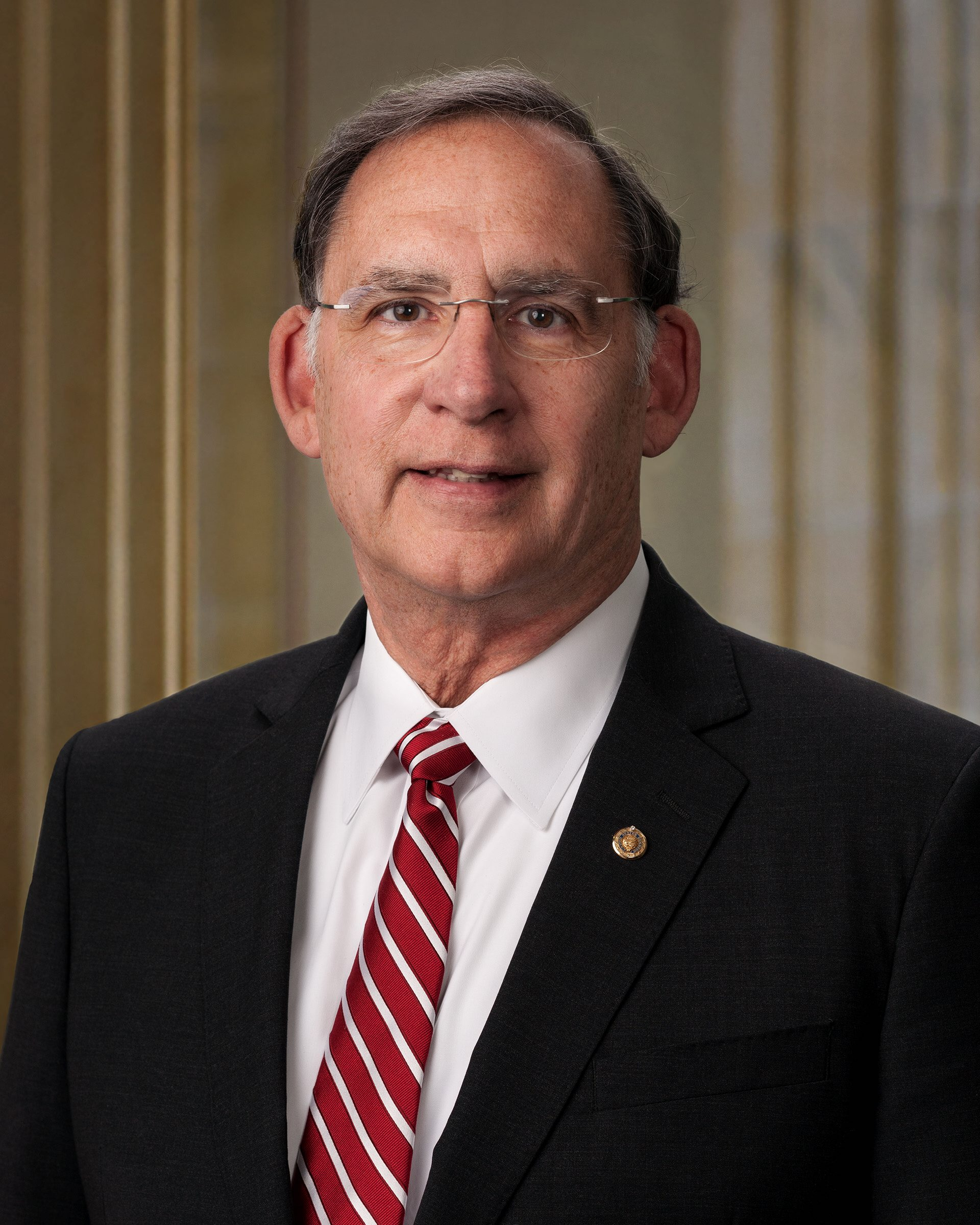

Nominee	John Boozman	George "Ozone" Lyne
Party	Republican	Write-In
Popular vote	141,478	1,577
Percentage	98.9%	1.1%
U.S. Representative before election
John Boozman
Republican
Elected U.S. Representative
John Boozman
Republican

Incumbent Republican John Boozman, who was first elected in 2001, ran for re-election. Boozman was re-elected with 98.9% of the vote.

=== General election ===
==== Results ====
Arkansas's 3rd congressional district election, 2002
Party	Candidate	Votes	%
Republican	John Boozman (incumbent)	141,478	98.9
Write-In	George "Ozone" Lyne	1,577	1.1
Total votes		143,055	100.0
Republican hold			

== District 4 ==
2002 Arkansas's 4th congressional district election
- November 5, 2002
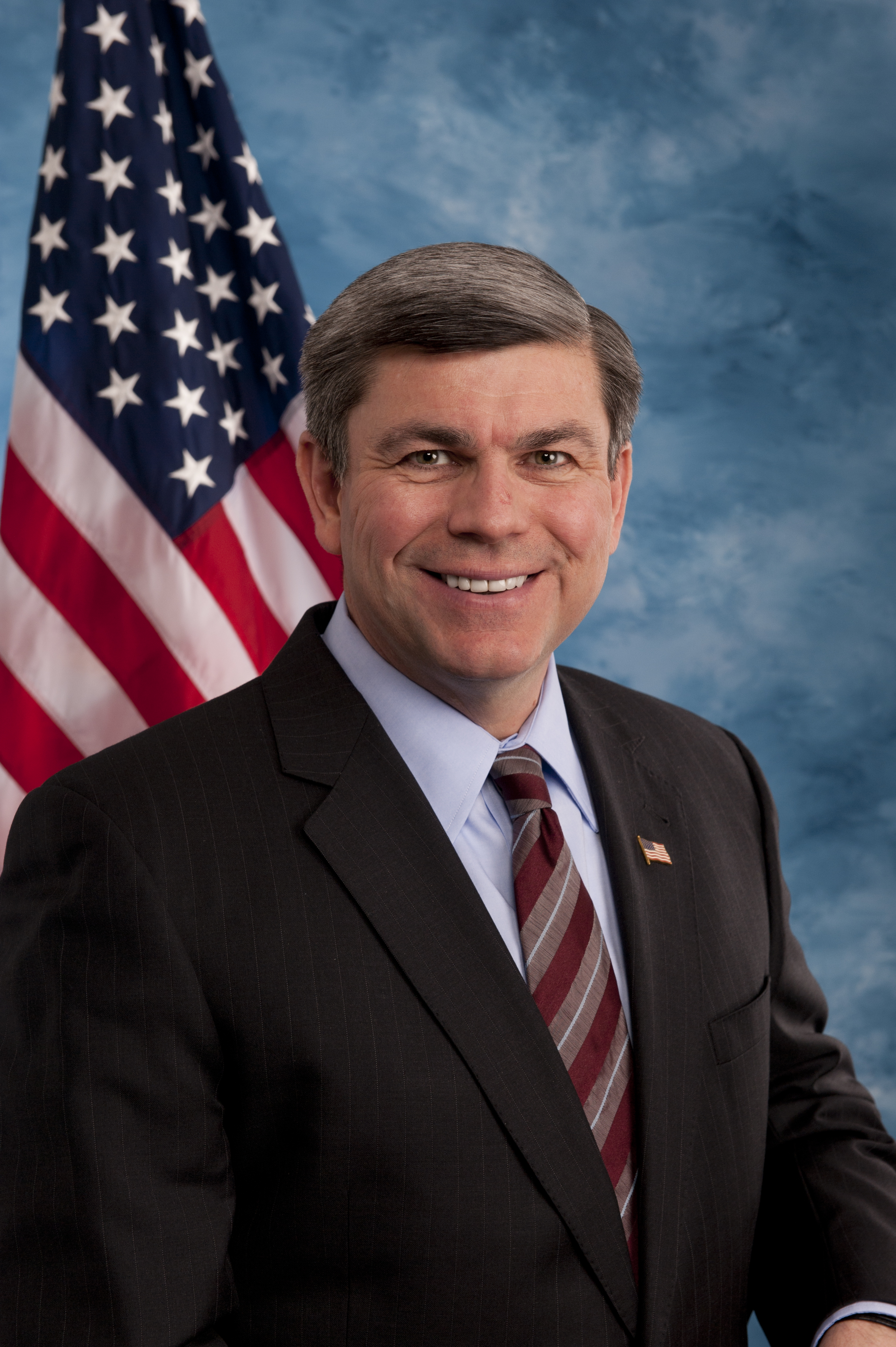

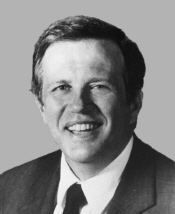
Nominee	Mike Ross	Jay Dickey
Party	Democratic	Republican
Popular vote	119,633	77,904
Percentage	60.6%	39.4%
U.S. Representative before election
Mike Ross
Democratic
Elected U.S. Representative
Mike Ross
Democratic

Incumbent Democrat Mike Ross, who was first elected in 2000, ran for re-election. Ross was re-elected with 60.6% of the vote.

=== General election ===
==== Results ====
Arkansas's 4th congressional district election, 2002
Party	Candidate	Votes	%
Democratic	Mike Ross (incumbent)	119,633	60.6
Republican	Jay Dickey	77,904	39.4
Total votes		197,537	100.0
Democratic hold			
