= 2008 United States House of Representatives elections in Arkansas =

- November 4, 2008

All 4 Arkansas seats to the United States House of Representatives
	Majority party	Minority party	Third party
Party	Democratic	Republican	Green
Last election	3	1	0
Seats won	3	1	0
Seat change	Steady	Steady	Steady
Popular vote	415,481	215,196	155,851
Percentage	52.8%	27.3%	19.8%
Swing	▼7.1%	▼12.8%	New

Democratic
70–80%
80–90%
>90%
Republican
60–70%
70–80%
80–90%

The 2008 United States House of Representatives elections in Arkansas were held on November 4, 2008 to determine who would represent the state of Arkansas in the United States House of Representatives. Arkansas has four seats in the House, apportioned according to the 2000 United States census. Representatives are elected for two-year terms; those elected served in the 111th Congress from January 4, 2009 until January 3, 2011. The election coincided with the 2008 presidential election.

No incumbent was opposed by a candidate from the other major party. The Green Party of Arkansas was the only opponent to the incumbent in most districts. This is the largest number of congressional candidates fielded by a party other than the Democratic or Republican parties in Arkansas since the People's Party in 1894. All incumbents were reelected.

As of 2024, this is the last election in which Democrats won both the House popular vote and the majority of congressional districts in Arkansas.

== Overview ==
United States House of Representatives elections in Arkansas, 2008
Party	Votes	Percentage	Seats	+/–
Democratic	415,481	52.78%	3	0
Republican	215,196	27.34%	1	0
Green	155,851	19.80%	0	0
Independent	665	0.08%	0	0
Totals	787,193	100.0%	4	—

== District 1 ==
2008 Arkansas's 1st congressional district election
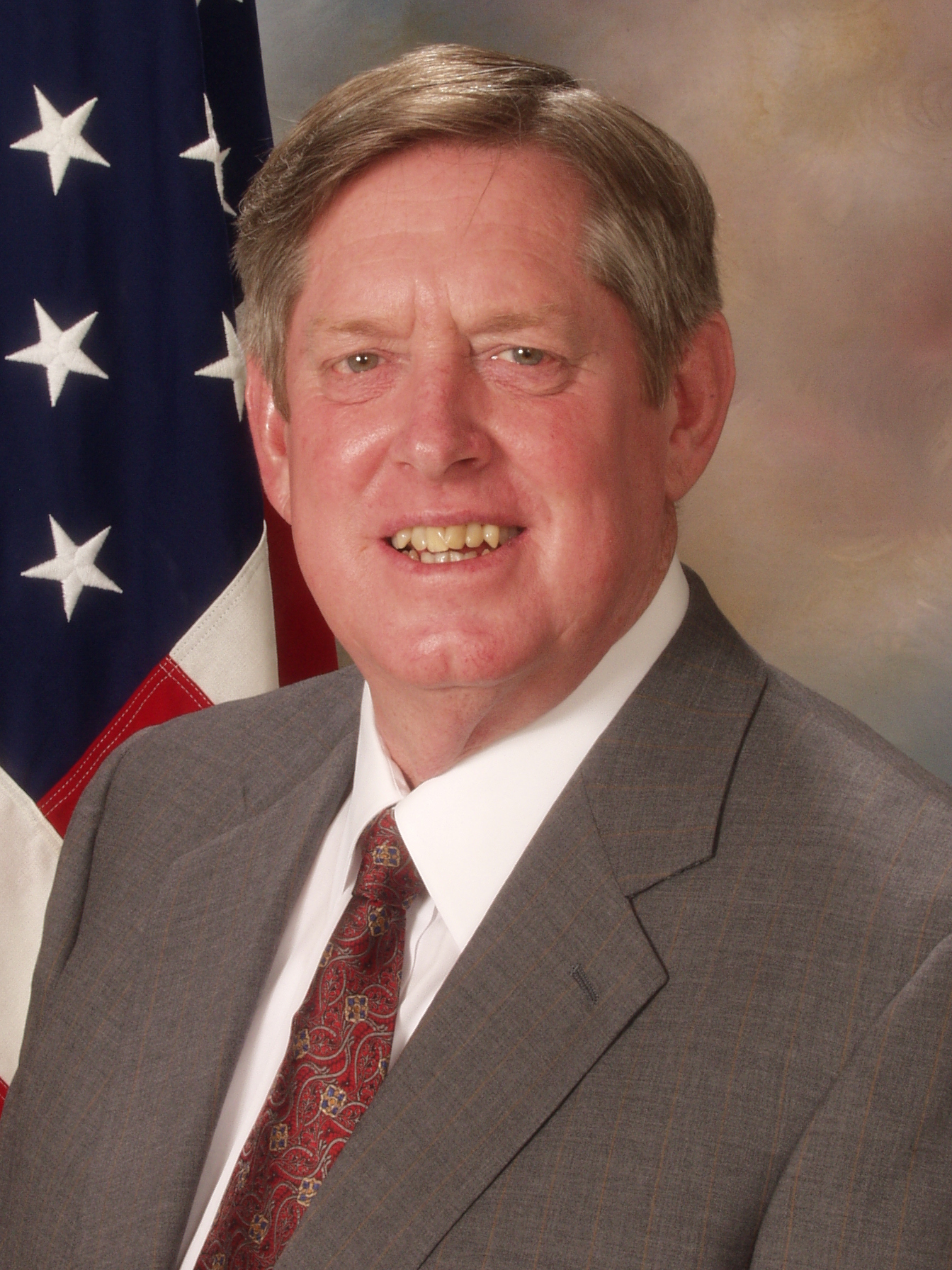
Nominee	Marion Berry (uncontested)
Party	Democratic
U.S. Representative before election
Marion Berry
Democratic
Elected U.S. Representative
Marion Berry
Democratic

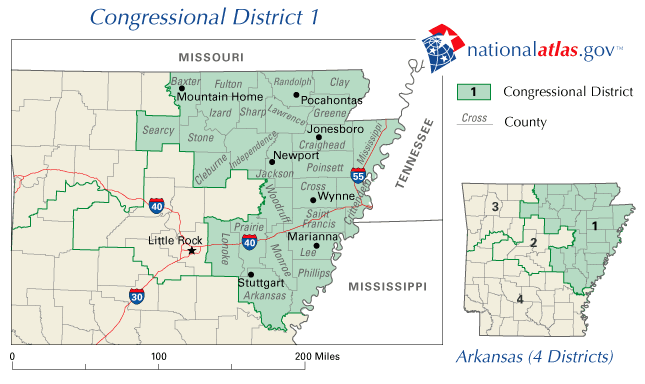

This district covers the northeast part of the state. CQ Politics forecasted the race as 'Safe Democrat'.

Marion Berry (D) - Incumbent

- Race ranking and details from CQ Politics
- Campaign contributions from OpenSecrets

Marion Berry won unopposed. The Secretary of State of Arkansas did not report vote totals for the election.

=== Predictions ===
Source	Ranking	As of
The Cook Political Report	Safe D	November 6, 2008
Rothenberg	Safe D	November 2, 2008
Sabato's Crystal Ball	Safe D	November 6, 2008
Real Clear Politics	Safe D	November 7, 2008
CQ Politics	Safe D	November 6, 2008

== District 2 ==
2008 Arkansas's 2nd congressional district election
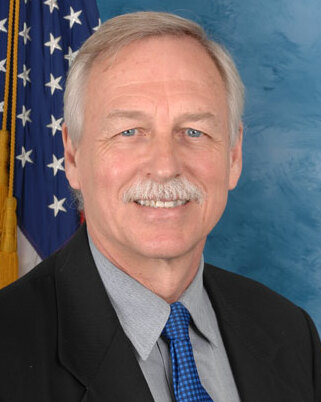

Nominee	Vic Snyder	Deb McFarland
Party	Democratic	Green
Popular vote	212,303	64,398
Percentage	76.5%	23.2%
- County results Snyder: 70–80% 80–90%
U.S. Representative before election
Vic Snyder
Democratic
Elected U.S. Representative
Vic Snyder
Democratic

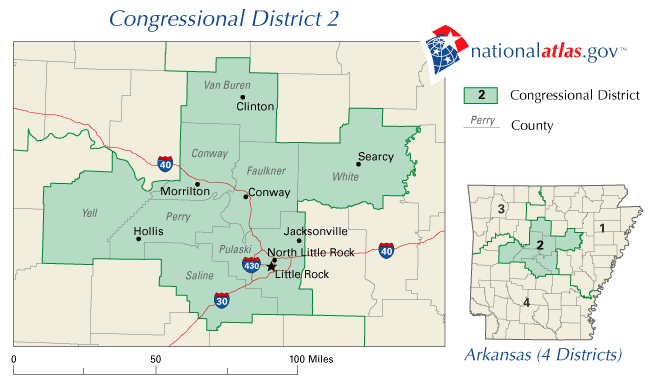

This district covers central Arkansas. CQ Politics forecasted the race as 'Safe Democrat'.

Vic Snyder (D) - Incumbent
Deb McFarland (Green)
Danial Suits (Write-in)

- Race ranking and details from CQ Politics
- Campaign contributions from OpenSecrets

=== Predictions ===
Source	Ranking	As of
The Cook Political Report	Safe D	November 6, 2008
Rothenberg	Safe D	November 2, 2008
Sabato's Crystal Ball	Safe D	November 6, 2008
Real Clear Politics	Safe D	November 7, 2008
CQ Politics	Safe D	November 6, 2008

Arkansas's 2nd congressional district election, 2008
Party	Candidate	Votes	%
Democratic	Vic Snyder (incumbent)	212,303	76.54
Green	Deb McFarland	64,398	23.22
Independent	Danial Suits (write-in)	665	0.24
Total votes		277,366	100.00
Democratic hold			

== District 3 ==
2008 Arkansas's 3rd congressional district election
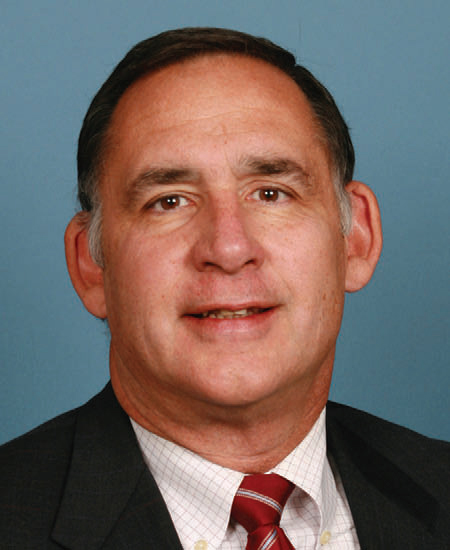

Nominee	John Boozman	Abel Tomlinson
Party	Republican	Green
Popular vote	215,196	58,850
Percentage	78.5%	21.5%
- County results Boozman: 60–70% 70–80% 80–90%
U.S. Representative before election
John Boozman
Republican
Elected U.S. Representative
John Boozman
Republican

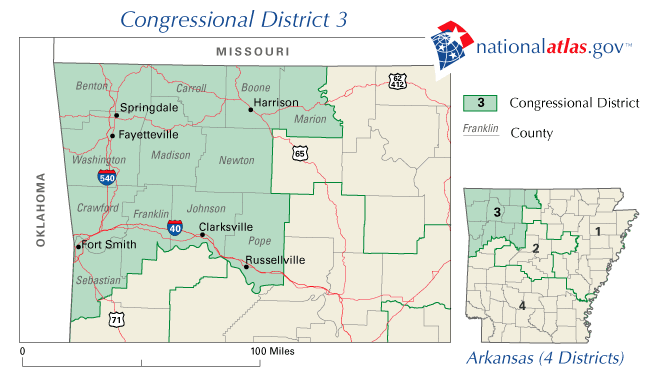

This district covers the northwest corner of the state. CQ Politics forecasted the race as 'Safe Republican'.

John Boozman (R) - Incumbent
Abel Noah Tomlinson (Green)

- Race ranking and details from CQ Politics
- Campaign contributions from OpenSecrets

=== Predictions ===
Source	Ranking	As of
The Cook Political Report	Safe R	November 6, 2008
Rothenberg	Safe R	November 2, 2008
Sabato's Crystal Ball	Safe R	November 6, 2008
Real Clear Politics	Safe R	November 7, 2008
CQ Politics	Safe R	November 6, 2008

Arkansas's 3rd congressional district election, 2008
Party	Candidate	Votes	%
Republican	John Boozman (incumbent)	215,196	78.53
Green	Abel Tomlinson	58,850	21.47
Total votes		274,046	100.00
Republican hold			

== District 4 ==
2008 Arkansas's 4th congressional district election
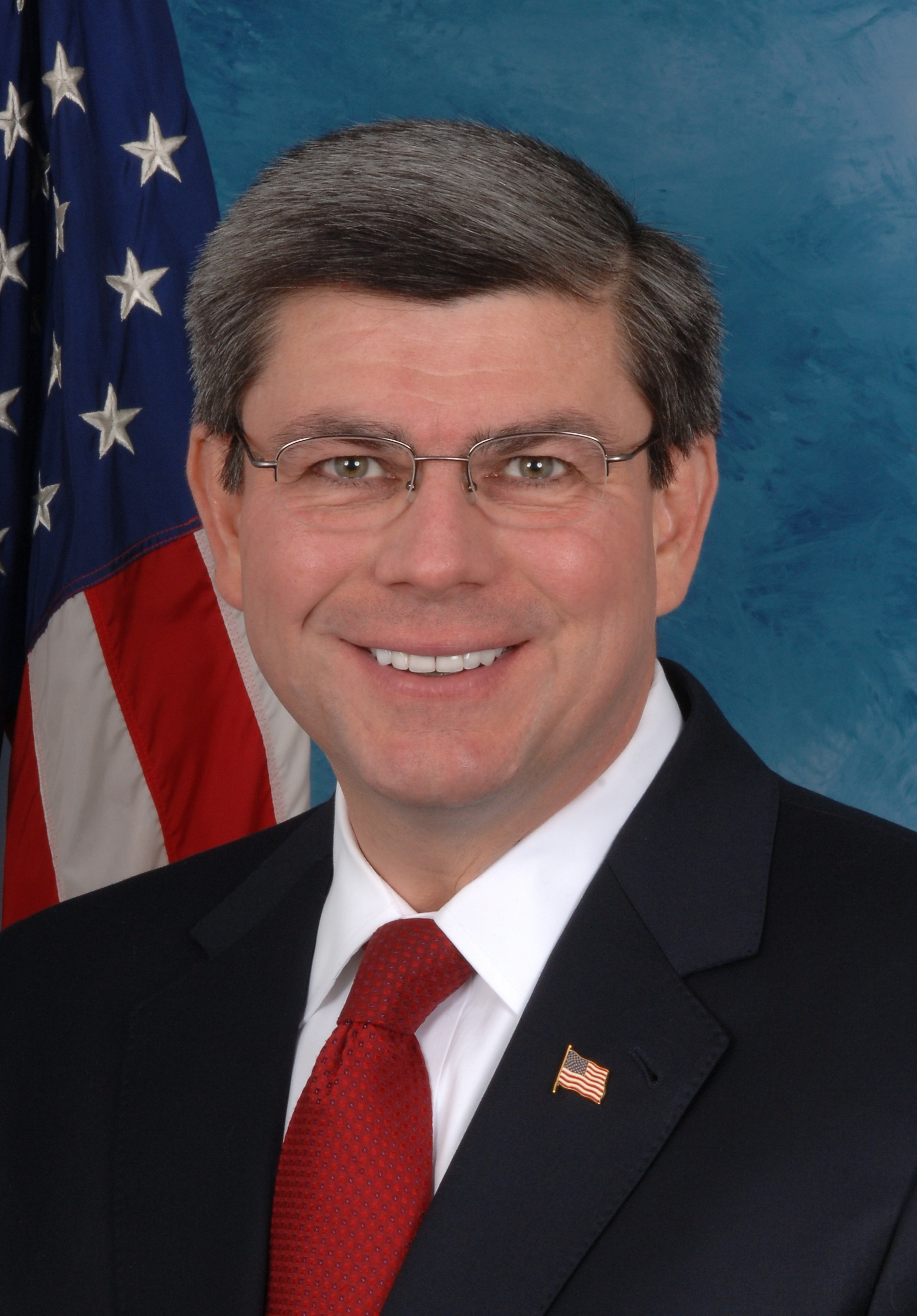

Nominee	Mike Ross	Josh Drake
Party	Democratic	Green
Popular vote	203,178	32,603
Percentage	86.2%	13.8%
- County results Ross: 70–80% 80–90% >90%
U.S. Representative before election
Mike Ross
Democratic
Elected U.S. Representative
Mike Ross
Democratic

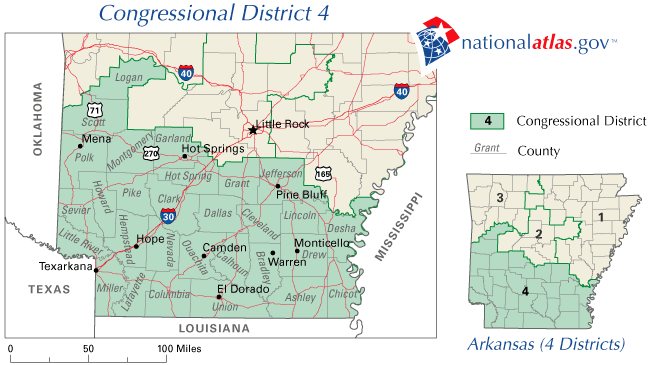

This district is roughly the southwest half of the state. CQ Politics forecasted the race as 'Safe Democrat'.

Mike Ross (D) - Incumbent
Joshua Drake (Green)

- Race ranking and details from CQ Politics
- Campaign contributions from OpenSecrets

=== Predictions ===
Source	Ranking	As of
The Cook Political Report	Safe D	November 6, 2008
Rothenberg	Safe D	November 2, 2008
Sabato's Crystal Ball	Safe D	November 6, 2008
Real Clear Politics	Safe D	November 7, 2008
CQ Politics	Safe D	November 6, 2008

Arkansas's 4th congressional district election, 2008
Party	Candidate	Votes	%
Democratic	Mike Ross (incumbent)	203,178	86.17
Green	Joshua Drake	32,603	13.83
Total votes		235,781	100.00
Democratic hold			

Preceded by 2006 elections	United States House elections in Arkansas; 2008	Succeeded by 2010 elections
