= Arkansas's 3rd congressional district =

U.S. House district for Arkansas

Coordinates: 36°08′18″N 94°03′45″W

- Interactive map of district boundaries since January 3, 2023
- Representative: Steve Womack; R–Rogers
- Area: 8,661 mi^{2} (22,430 km^{2})
- Distribution: 54.4% urban; 45.6% rural
- Population (2025): 834,075
- Median household income: $78,855
- Ethnicity: 67.7% White; 16.5% Hispanic; 6.2% Two or more races; 3.5% Asian; 2.9% Black; 1.6% Pacific Islander Americans; 1.4% Native American; 0.3% other
- Cook PVI: R+13

Arkansas's 3rd congressional district is a congressional district in the U.S. state of Arkansas. The district covers Northwest Arkansas and takes in Fort Smith, Fayetteville, Springdale, and Bentonville.

The district is represented by Republican Steve Womack and is the wealthiest congressional district in the state of Arkansas.

== Character ==
Walmart's corporate headquarters are located in this district in Bentonville. The University of Arkansas is located in Fayetteville. Springdale is the home of Tyson Foods.

The district swung Republican long before the rest of the state. It has been in Republican hands continuously since the election of John Paul Hammerschmidt in 1966. However, conservative Democrats continued to hold most state and local offices well into the 1990s.

George W. Bush received 62% of the vote in this district in 2004. John McCain swept the district in 2008 with 64.16% of the vote while Barack Obama received 33.45% of the vote. It was McCain's best and Obama's worst performance in Arkansas.

== Composition ==
The 3rd district comprises the entirety of the following counties:

#	County	Seat	Population
7	Benton	Bentonville	311,013
15	Carroll	Berryville, Eureka Springs	28,814
33	Crawford	Van Buren	61,891
87	Madison	Huntsville	17,775
131	Sebastian	Fort Smith, Greenwood	129,098
143	Washington	Fayetteville	261,549

== Recent election results from statewide races ==
Year	Office	Results
2008	President	McCain 63% - 35%
2012	President	Romney 67% - 33%
2016	President	Trump 60% - 32%
2016	Senate	Boozman 63% - 33%
2018	Governor	Hutchinson 65% - 32%
2018	Lt. Governor	Griffin 63% - 34%
2018	Attorney General	Rutledge 62% - 35%
2020	President	Trump 60% - 37%
2022	Senate	Boozman 63% - 33%
2022	Governor	Huckabee Sanders 60% - 38%
2022	Lt. Governor	Rutledge 61% - 35%
2022	Attorney General	Griffin 65% - 35%
2022	Secretary of State	Thurston 64% - 36%
2022	Treasurer	Lowery 64% - 36%
2022	Auditor	Milligan 64% - 31%
2024	President	Trump 61% - 36%
2024	Treasurer (Spec.)	Thurston 63% - 32%
2026	Senate	Cotton 50% - 46%
2026	Governor	Huckabee Sanders 50% - 42%

== List of members representing the district ==
Member	Party	Years	Cong ress	Electoral history	Location
District created March 4, 1863
Vacant		March 4, 1863 – June 22, 1868	38th 39th 40th	Civil War and Reconstruction	
Thomas Boles (Dardanelle)	Republican	June 22, 1868 – March 3, 1871	40th 41st	Elected in 1868 to finish term. Re-elected in 1868. Lost re-election.	
John Edwards (Fort Smith)	Liberal Republican	March 4, 1871 – February 9, 1872	42nd	Elected in 1870. Lost contested election.	
Thomas Boles (Dardanelle)	Republican	February 9, 1872 – March 3, 1873	42nd	Successfully contested Edwards's election. Retired.	
William W. Wilshire (Little Rock)	Republican	March 4, 1873 – June 16, 1874	43rd	Elected in 1872. Lost contested election.	
Thomas M. Gunter (Fayetteville)	Democratic	June 16, 1874 – March 3, 1875	43rd	Successfully contested Wilshire's election. Redistricted to the 4th district.	
William W. Wilshire (Little Rock)	Democratic	March 4, 1875 – March 3, 1877	44th	Elected in 1874. Retired.	
Jordan E. Cravens (Clarksville)	Independent Democratic	March 4, 1877 – March 3, 1879	45th 46th 47th	Elected in 1876.	
Jordan E. Cravens (Clarksville)	Democratic	March 4, 1879 – March 3, 1883	45th 46th 47th	Re-elected in 1878 as a Democrat. Re-elected in 1880. Lost renomination.	
John Henry Rogers (Fort Smith)	Democratic	March 4, 1883 – March 3, 1885	48th	Elected in 1882. Redistricted to the 4th district.	
Vacant		March 4, 1885 – December 7, 1885	49th	James K. Jones was redistricted from the 2nd district and re-elected in 1884, but resigned before the term began when elected U.S. senator.	
Thomas Chipman McRae (Prescott)	Democratic	December 7, 1885 – March 3, 1903	49th 50th 51st 52nd 53rd 54th 55th 56th 57th	Elected to finish Jones's term. Re-elected in 1886. Re-elected in 1888. Re-elected in 1890. Re-elected in 1892. Re-elected in 1894. Re-elected in 1896. Re-elected in 1898. Re-elected in 1900. Retired.	
Hugh A. Dinsmore (Fayetteville)	Democratic	March 4, 1903 – March 3, 1905	58th	Redistricted from the 5th district and Re-elected in 1902. Lost renomination.	
John C. Floyd (Yellville)	Democratic	March 4, 1905 – March 3, 1915	59th 60th 61st 62nd 63rd	Elected in 1904. Re-elected in 1906. Re-elected in 1908. Re-elected in 1910. Re-elected in 1912. Retired.	
John N. Tillman (Fayetteville)	Democratic	March 4, 1915 – March 3, 1929	64th 65th 66th 67th 68th 69th 70th	Elected in 1914. Re-elected in 1916. Re-elected in 1918. Re-elected in 1920. Re-elected in 1922. Re-elected in 1924. Re-elected in 1926. Retired.	
Claude A. Fuller (Eureka Springs)	Democratic	March 4, 1929 – January 3, 1939	71st 72nd 73rd 74th 75th	Elected in 1928. Re-elected in 1930. Re-elected in 1932. Re-elected in 1934. Re-elected in 1936. Lost renomination.	
Clyde T. Ellis (Bentonville)	Democratic	January 3, 1939 – January 3, 1943	76th 77th	Elected in 1938. Re-elected in 1940. Retired to run for U.S. senator.	
J. William Fulbright (Fayetteville)	Democratic	January 3, 1943 – January 3, 1945	78th	Elected in 1942. Retired to run for U.S. senator.	
James William Trimble (Berryville)	Democratic	January 3, 1945 – January 3, 1967	79th 80th 81st 82nd 83rd 84th 85th 86th 87th 88th 89th	Elected in 1944. Re-elected in 1946. Re-elected in 1948. Re-elected in 1950. Re-elected in 1952. Re-elected in 1954. Re-elected in 1956. Re-elected in 1958. Re-elected in 1960. Re-elected in 1962. Re-elected in 1964. Lost re-election.	
John Paul Hammerschmidt (Harrison)	Republican	January 3, 1967 – January 3, 1993	90th 91st 92nd 93rd 94th 95th 96th 97th 98th 99th 100th 101st 102nd	Elected in 1966. Re-elected in 1968. Re-elected in 1970. Re-elected in 1972. Re-elected in 1974. Re-elected in 1976. Re-elected in 1978. Re-elected in 1980. Re-elected in 1982. Re-elected in 1984. Re-elected in 1986. Re-elected in 1988. Re-elected in 1990. Retired.	
Tim Hutchinson (Bentonville)	Republican	January 3, 1993 – January 2, 1997	103rd 104th	Elected in 1992. Re-elected in 1994. Retired to run for U.S. senator and resigned early when elected.	1993–2003 [data missing]
Vacant		January 2, 1997 – January 3, 1997	104th		1993–2003 [data missing]
Asa Hutchinson (Bentonville)	Republican	January 3, 1997 – August 6, 2001	105th 106th 107th	Elected in 1996. Re-elected in 1998. Re-elected in 2000. Resigned when appointed Director of the Drug Enforcement Administration.	1993–2003 [data missing]
Vacant		August 6, 2001 – November 20, 2001	107th		1993–2003 [data missing]
John Boozman (Rogers)	Republican	November 20, 2001 – January 3, 2011	107th 108th 109th 110th 111th	Elected to finish Hutchinson's term. Re-elected in 2002. Re-elected in 2004. Re-elected in 2006. Re-elected in 2008. Retired to run for U.S. senator.	1993–2003 [data missing]
John Boozman (Rogers)	Republican	November 20, 2001 – January 3, 2011	107th 108th 109th 110th 111th	Elected to finish Hutchinson's term. Re-elected in 2002. Re-elected in 2004. Re-elected in 2006. Re-elected in 2008. Retired to run for U.S. senator.	2003–2013
Steve Womack (Rogers)	Republican	January 3, 2011 – present	112th 113th 114th 115th 116th 117th 118th 119th	Elected in 2010. Re-elected in 2012. Re-elected in 2014. Re-elected in 2016. Re-elected in 2018. Re-elected in 2020. Re-elected in 2022. Re-elected in 2024. Re-elected in 2026.	2003–2013
Steve Womack (Rogers)	Republican	January 3, 2011 – present	112th 113th 114th 115th 116th 117th 118th 119th	Elected in 2010. Re-elected in 2012. Re-elected in 2014. Re-elected in 2016. Re-elected in 2018. Re-elected in 2020. Re-elected in 2022. Re-elected in 2024. Re-elected in 2026.	2013–2023
Steve Womack (Rogers)	Republican	January 3, 2011 – present	112th 113th 114th 115th 116th 117th 118th 119th	Elected in 2010. Re-elected in 2012. Re-elected in 2014. Re-elected in 2016. Re-elected in 2018. Re-elected in 2020. Re-elected in 2022. Re-elected in 2024. Re-elected in 2026.	2023–present

== Recent election results ==
=== 2002 ===
2002 United States House of Representatives elections in Arkansas: District 3
Party	Candidate	Votes	%
Republican	John Boozman (Incumbent)	141,478	98.90
Write-In	George N. Lyne	1,577	1.10
Majority		139,901	97.80
Turnout		143,055	
Republican hold			

=== 2004 ===
2004 United States House of Representatives elections in Arkansas: District 3
Party	Candidate	Votes	%
Republican	John Boozman (Incumbent)	160,629	59.32
Democratic	Jan Judy	103,158	38.09
Independent	Dale Morfey	7,016	2.59
Majority		57,471	21.23
Turnout		270,803	
Republican hold			

=== 2006 ===
2006 United States House of Representatives elections in Arkansas: District 3
Party	Candidate	Votes	%
Republican	John Boozman (Incumbent)	125,039	62.23
Democratic	Woodrow Anderson	75,885	37.77
Majority		49,154	24.46
Turnout		200,924	
Republican hold			

=== 2008 ===
2008 United States House of Representatives elections in Arkansas: District 3
Party	Candidate	Votes	%
Republican	John Boozman (Incumbent)	215,196	78.53
Green	Abel Noah Tomlinson	58,850	21.47
Majority		156,346	57.06
Turnout		274,046	
Republican hold			

=== 2010 ===
2010 United States House of Representatives elections in Arkansas: District 3
Party	Candidate	Votes	%
Republican	Steve Womack	148,581	72.44
Democratic	David Whitaker	56,542	27.56
Majority		92,039	44.88
Turnout		205,123	
Republican hold			

=== 2012 ===
2012 United States House of Representatives elections in Arkansas: District 3
Party	Candidate	Votes	%
Republican	Steve Womack (Incumbent)	186,467	75.90
Green	Rebekah Kennedy	39,318	16.01
Libertarian	David Pangrac	19,875	8.09
Majority		147,149	59.89
Turnout		245,660	
Republican hold			

=== 2014 ===
2014 United States House of Representatives elections in Arkansas: District 3
Party	Candidate	Votes	%
Republican	Steve Womack (Incumbent)	151,630	79
Libertarian	Grant Bland	39,305	21
Majority		112,325	59
Turnout		190,935	
Republican hold			

=== 2016 ===
2016 United States House of Representatives elections in Arkansas: District 3
Party	Candidate	Votes	%
Republican	Steve Womack (Incumbent)	217,192	77
Libertarian	Grant Bland	63,715	23
Majority		153,477	54
Turnout		280,907	
Republican hold			

=== 2018 ===
2018 United States House of Representatives elections in Arkansas: District 3
Party	Candidate	Votes	%
Republican	Steve Womack (Incumbent)	148,717	64.7
Democratic	Joshua Mahony	74,952	32.6
Libertarian	Michael Kalagias	5,899	2.6
n/a	Write-ins	140	0.1
Turnout		229,708	
Republican hold			

=== 2020 ===
2020 United States House of Representatives elections in Arkansas: District 3
Party	Candidate	Votes	%
Republican	Steve Womack (Incumbent)	214,960	64.31
Democratic	Celeste Williams	106,325	31.81
Libertarian	Michael Kalagias	12,997	3.88
Turnout		334,262	
Republican hold			

=== 2022 ===
2022 United States House of Representatives elections in Arkansas: District 3
Party	Candidate	Votes	%
Republican	Steve Womack (incumbent)	142,401	63.69
Democratic	Lauren Mallett-Hays	73,541	32.89
Libertarian	Michael Kalagias	7,646	3.42
Total votes		223,588	100.0
Republican hold			

=== 2024 ===
Arkansas's 3rd congressional district, 2024
Party	Candidate	Votes	%
Republican	Steve Womack (incumbent)	192,101	63.8
Democratic	Caitlin Draper	95,652	31.8
Libertarian	Bobby Wilson	13,331	4.4
Total votes		301,084	100
Republican hold			
