= Jay Dickey =

American politician (1939–2017)

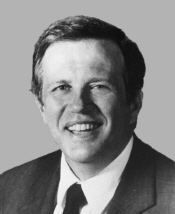

Member of the U.S. House of Representatives from Arkansas's 4th district
- In office January 3, 1993 – January 3, 2001
- Preceded by: Beryl Anthony Jr.
- Succeeded by: Mike Ross

Personal details
- Born: Jay Woodson Dickey Jr. December 14, 1939 Pine Bluff, Arkansas, U.S.
- Died: April 20, 2017 (aged 77) Pine Bluff, Arkansas, U.S.
- Party: Republican
- Spouse: Betty Clark (divorced 1987)
- Children: John, Laura, Ted, and Rachel
- Education: Pine Bluff High School; Hendrix College; University of Arkansas at Fayetteville; University of Arkansas School of Law

Jay Woodson Dickey Jr. (December 14, 1939 – April 20, 2017) was an American politician. A member of the Republican Party, he was U.S. Representative for Arkansas's 4th congressional district from 1993 to 2001. The amendment known as the Dickey Amendment (1996) blocks the Centers for Disease Control and Prevention from funding injury prevention research that might promote gun control, and the Dickey–Wicker Amendment (1995) prohibits federal funds to be spent on research that involves the destruction of a human embryo.

== Education and early career ==
Born in Pine Bluff, Arkansas, Dickey graduated from Pine Bluff High School in 1957; after attending Hendrix College in Conway, Arkansas, he obtained his Bachelor of Arts in 1961 from the University of Arkansas at Fayetteville. In 1963, he received his Juris Doctor from the University of Arkansas School of Law. He began his career in law in private practice, and later served as city attorney of Pine Bluff from 1968 to 1970.

In 1988 then-Governor Bill Clinton appointed Dickey as a special justice for a case before the Arkansas Supreme Court.

== Political career ==
On November 3, 1992, the same day as Clinton's election as U.S. President, Dickey defeated Arkansas Secretary of State William J. "Bill" McCuen, described as a "scandal-plagued Democratic nominee". The first Republican to hold this House seat, he was re-elected three times. He served on the U.S. House Committee on Appropriations, and five of its subcommittees: Agriculture, National Security, Energy and Water, Transportation and Labor, Health and Human Services, and Education.

A Second Amendment rights advocate, in 1996 Dickey responded to a supposed bias on the part of the National Center for Injury Prevention and Control at the Centers for Disease Control and Prevention, whose research on firearm injuries and fatalities was deemed motivated by pro gun-control politics, rather than science. Dickey successfully passed an amendment to eliminate $2.6 million from the CDC budget, reflecting the amount the CDC had previously spent on gun research.

The outspoken, controversial, and conservative Dickey saw his popularity decline in his overall moderate district. In 2000, he lost in his reelection campaign to the Democratic candidate Mike Ross in a close race. Then House Speaker Dennis Hastert of Illinois came into the district in a bid to save Dickey's seat, while President Clinton poured massive resources on behalf of Ross.

Dickey opposed Ross in 2002 in an attempt to return to his seat, but he was defeated, 60-40 percent.

== Subsequent career ==
After leaving office, Dickey operated JD Consulting, primarily a federal government lobbying firm, which represents clients' interest in children's health care, navigation and water, tax matters, homeland security, and roads.

Following the mass shooting in Aurora, Colorado, Dickey publicly reversed his position on gun violence research. He said that he should not have become "the NRA's point person in Congress" to suppress valid and valuable work. He called for new scientific research in the field.

== Death ==
Dickey died on April 20, 2017, after a long battle with Parkinson's disease.

== Electoral history ==
The following are the electoral results from the Arkansas's 4th congressional district for 1992–2002.

Year	Democrat	Votes	Pct	Republican	Votes	Pct
1992	W. J. "Bill" McCuen	102,918	48%	Jay Dickey	113,009	52%
1994	Jay Bradford	81,370	48%	Jay Dickey	87,469	52%
1996	Vincent Tolliver	72,391	36%	Jay Dickey	125,956	64%
1998	Judy Smith	68,194	42%	Jay Dickey	92,346	58%
2000	Mike Ross	108,143	51%	Jay Dickey	104,017	49%
2002	Mike Ross	119,633	61%	Jay Dickey	77,904	39%

U.S. House of Representatives
Preceded by Beryl Anthony, Jr.	Member of the U.S. House of Representatives from Arkansas's 4th congressional district January 3, 1993 – January 3, 2001	Succeeded by Mike Ross
