= 2006 United States House of Representatives elections in Arkansas =

- November 7, 2006

All 4 Arkansas seats to the United States House of Representatives
| | Majority party | Minority party |
|---|---|---|
| Party | Democratic | Republican |
| Last election | 3 | 1 |
| Seats won | 3 | 1 |
| Seat change | Steady | Steady |
| Popular vote | 456,569 | 306,442 |
| Percentage | 59.8% | 40.2% |
| Swing | ▼5.9% | ▲6.5% |

Democratic
50–60%
60–70%
70–80%
80–90%
Republican
50–60%
60–70%
70–80%

The 2006 United States House of Representatives elections in Arkansas were held on November 4, 2006, to determine who would represent the state of Arkansas in the United States House of Representatives. Arkansas has four seats in the House, apportioned according to the 2000 United States census. Representatives are elected for two-year terms. Every incumbent won re-election easily.

== Overview ==
United States House of Representatives elections in Arkansas, 2006
| Party | Votes | Percentage | Seats | +/– |
|---|---|---|---|---|
| Democratic | 456,569 | 59.8% | 3 | — |
| Republican | 306,442 | 40.2% | 1 | — |
| Totals | 763,011 | 100.00% | 4 | — |

== District 1 ==
2006 Arkansas's 1st congressional district election
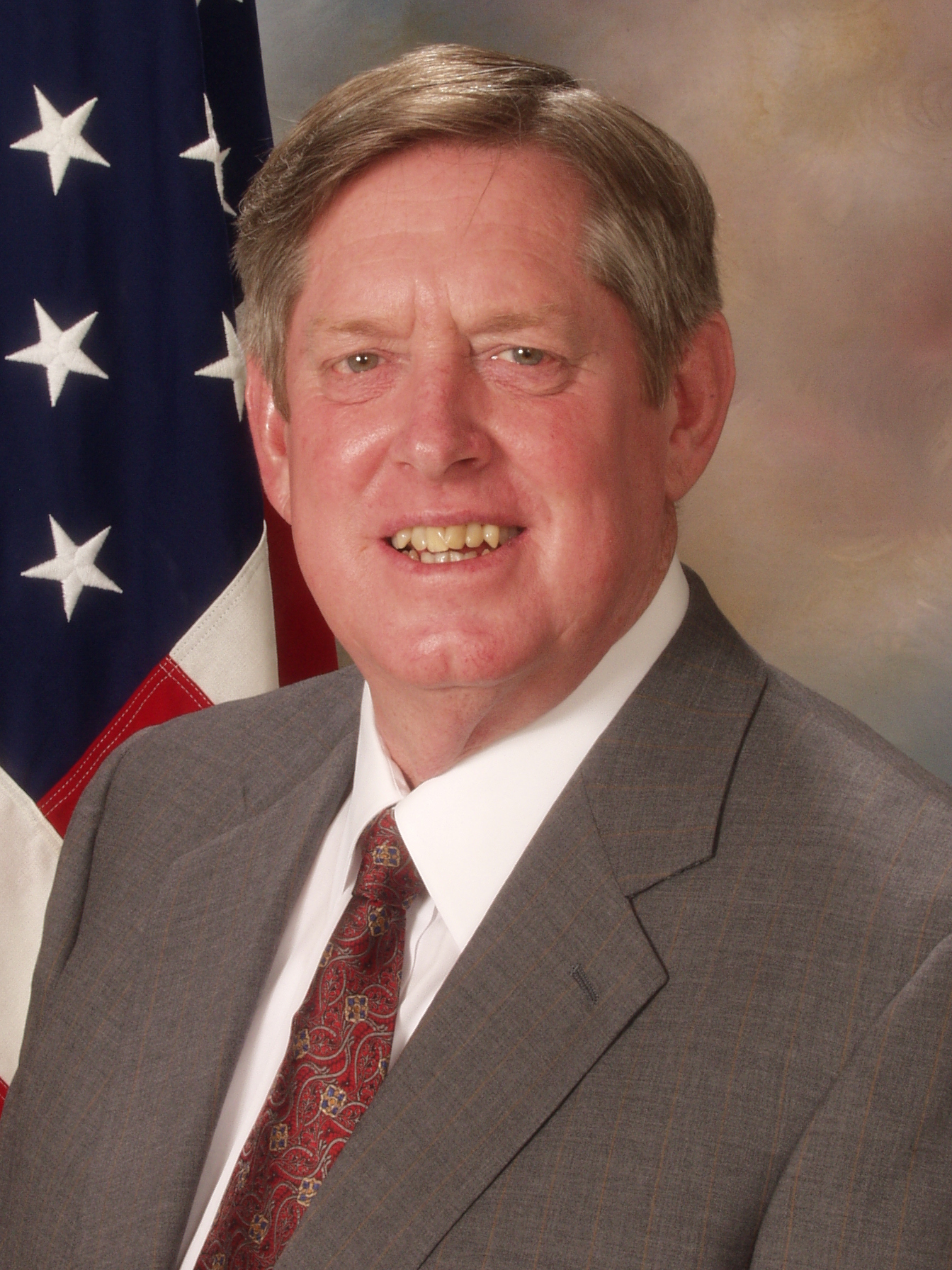

| Nominee | Marion Berry | Stubby Stumbaugh |
| Party | Democratic | Republican |
| Popular vote | 127,577 | 56,611 |
| Percentage | 69.3% | 30.7% |
- County results Berry: 50–60% 60–70% 70–80% 80–90%
U.S. Representative before election
Marion Berry
Democratic
Elected U.S. Representative
Marion Berry
Democratic

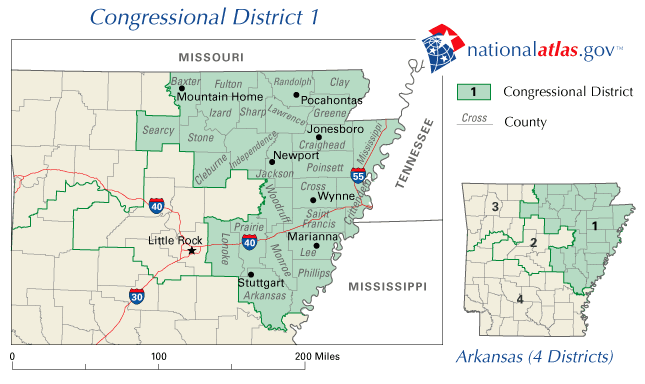

Incumbent Democrat Marion Berry defeated Republican Stubby Stumbaugh, who was the Mayor of Cabot, Arkansas. This district covers the northeast part of the state.

=== Predictions ===
| Source | Ranking | As of |
|---|---|---|
| The Cook Political Report | Safe D | November 6, 2006 |
| Rothenberg | Safe D | November 6, 2006 |
| Sabato's Crystal Ball | Safe D | November 6, 2006 |
| Real Clear Politics | Safe D | November 7, 2006 |
| CQ Politics | Safe D | November 7, 2006 |

=== Results ===
Arkansas's 1st congressional district election, 2006
| Party | Candidate | Votes | % |
|---|---|---|---|
| Democratic | Marion Berry (incumbent) | 127,577 | 69.26 |
| Republican | Stubby Stumbaugh | 56,611 | 30.74 |
| Total votes | | 184,188 | 100.00 |
| Democratic hold | | | |

== District 2 ==
2006 Arkansas's 2nd congressional district election
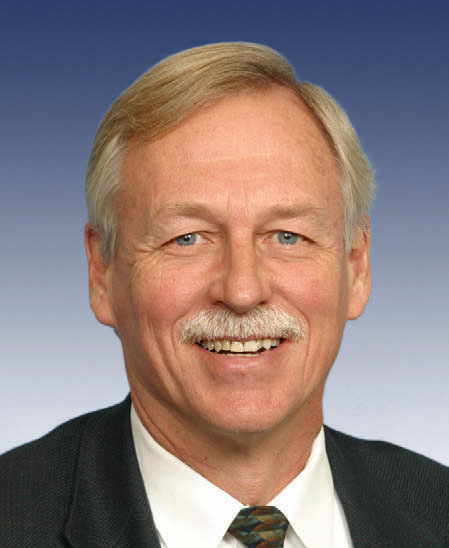

| Nominee | Vic Snyder | Andy Mayberry |
| Party | Democratic | Republican |
| Popular vote | 124,871 | 81,432 |
| Percentage | 60.5% | 39.5% |
- County results Berry: 50–60% 60–70% Mayberry: 50–60%
U.S. Representative before election
Vic Snyder
Democratic
Elected U.S. Representative
Vic Snyder
Democratic

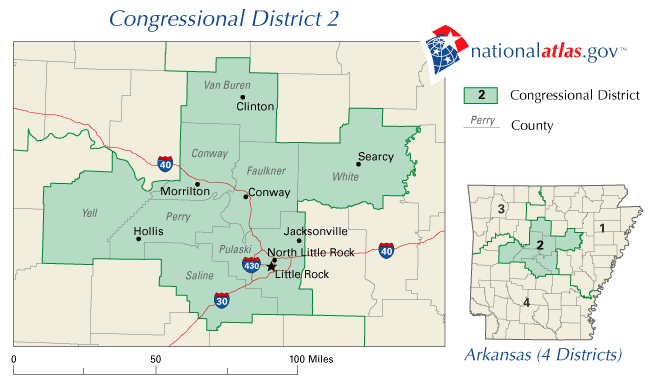

Incumbent Democrat Vic Snyder defeated Republican Andy Mayberry. This district covers central Arkansas.

=== Predictions ===
| Source | Ranking | As of |
|---|---|---|
| The Cook Political Report | Safe D | November 6, 2006 |
| Rothenberg | Safe D | November 6, 2006 |
| Sabato's Crystal Ball | Safe D | November 6, 2006 |
| Real Clear Politics | Safe D | November 7, 2006 |
| CQ Politics | Safe D | November 7, 2006 |

=== Results ===
Arkansas's 2nd congressional district election, 2006
| Party | Candidate | Votes | % |
|---|---|---|---|
| Democratic | Vic Snyder (incumbent) | 124,871 | 60.53 |
| Republican | Andy Mayberry | 81,432 | 39.47 |
| Total votes | | 184,188 | 100.00 |
| Democratic hold | | | |

== District 3 ==
2006 Arkansas's 3rd congressional district election
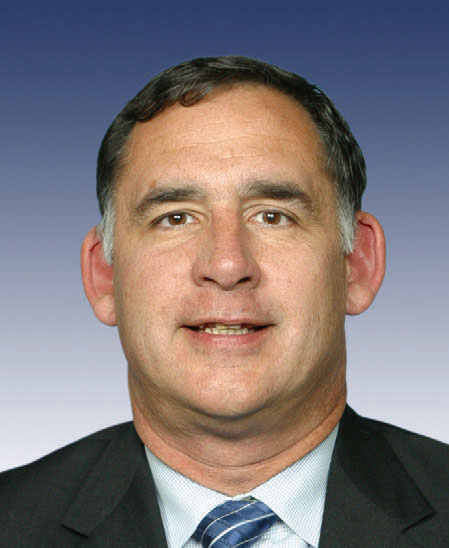

| Nominee | John Boozman | Woodrow Anderson |
| Party | Republican | Democratic |
| Popular vote | 125,039 | 75,885 |
| Percentage | 62.2% | 37.8% |
- County results Boozman: 50–60% 60–70% 70–80%
U.S. Representative before election
John Boozman
Republican
Elected U.S. Representative
John Boozman
Republican

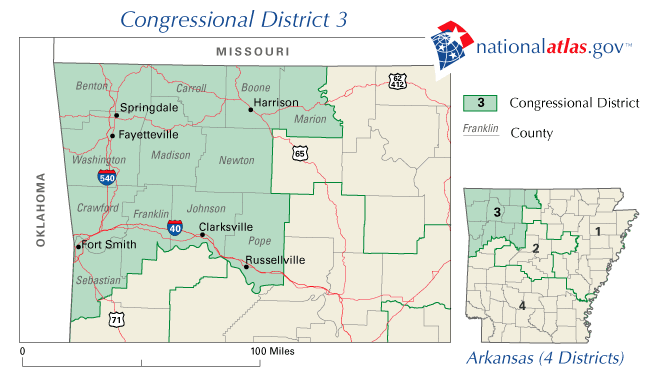

Incumbent Republican John Boozman defeated Democrat Woodrow Anderson, businessman and member of the U.S. Army Reserve. This district covers the northwest corner of the state.

=== Endorsements ===
Woodrow Anderson (D)

Individuals

- Wesley Clark, General, 2004 democratic presidential candidate

==== Predictions ====
| Source | Ranking | As of |
|---|---|---|
| The Cook Political Report | Safe R | November 6, 2006 |
| Rothenberg | Safe R | November 6, 2006 |
| Sabato's Crystal Ball | Safe R | November 6, 2006 |
| Real Clear Politics | Safe R | November 7, 2006 |
| CQ Politics | Safe R | November 7, 2006 |

=== Results ===
Arkansas's 3rd congressional district election, 2006
| Party | Candidate | Votes | % |
|---|---|---|---|
| Republican | John Boozman (incumbent) | 125,039 | 62.23 |
| Democratic | Woodrow Anderson | 75,885 | 37.77 |
| Total votes | | 200,924 | 100.00 |
| Republican hold | | | |

== District 4 ==
2006 Arkansas's 4th congressional district election
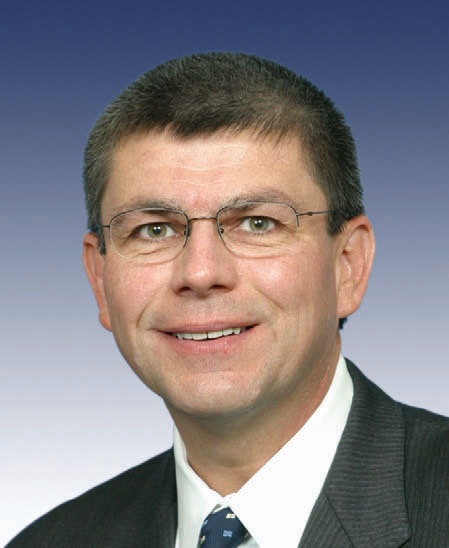

| Nominee | Mike Ross | Joe Ross |
| Party | Democratic | Republican |
| Popular vote | 128,236 | 43,360 |
| Percentage | 74.7% | 25.3% |
- County results M. Ross: 60–70% 70–80% 80–90%
U.S. Representative before election
Mike Ross
Democratic
Elected U.S. Representative
Mike Ross
Democratic

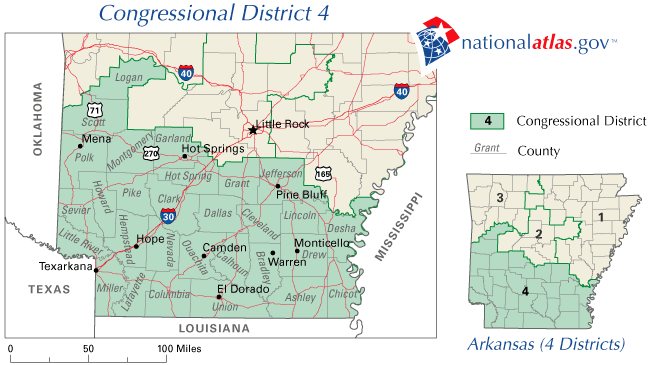

Incumbent Democrat Mike Ross defeated Republican Joe Ross. This district is roughly the southwest half of the state.

=== Predictions ===
| Source | Ranking | As of |
|---|---|---|
| The Cook Political Report | Safe D | November 6, 2006 |
| Rothenberg | Safe D | November 6, 2006 |
| Sabato's Crystal Ball | Safe D | November 6, 2006 |
| Real Clear Politics | Safe D | November 7, 2006 |
| CQ Politics | Safe D | November 7, 2006 |

=== Results ===
Arkansas's 4th congressional district election, 2006
| Party | Candidate | Votes | % |
|---|---|---|---|
| Democratic | Mike Ross (incumbent) | 128,236 | 74.73 |
| Republican | Joe Ross | 43,360 | 25.27 |
| Total votes | | 171,596 | 100.00 |
| Democratic hold | | | |
