= Mike Ross (politician) =

American businessman and politician (born 1961)

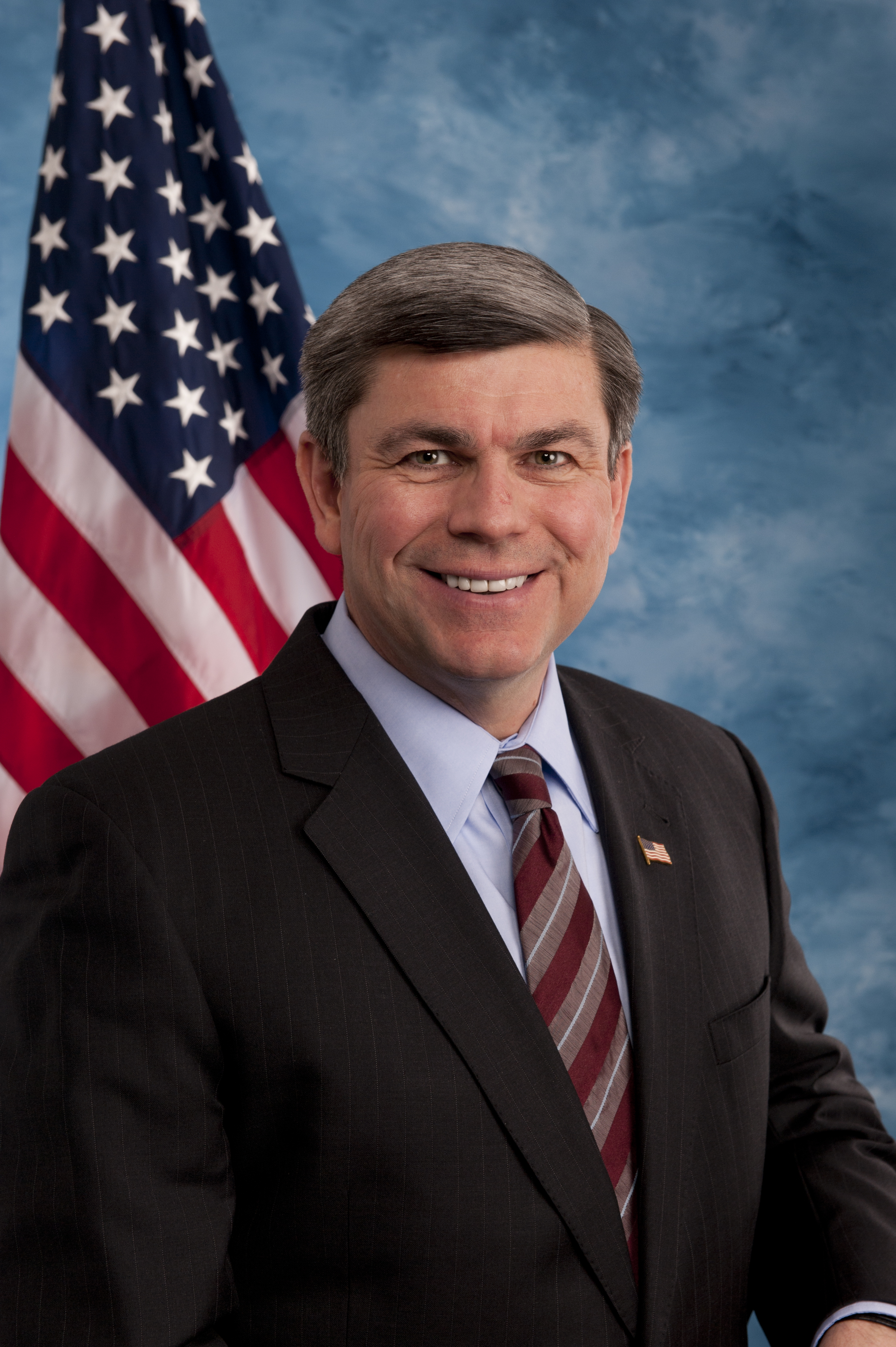
- Official portrait, 2011

Member of the U.S. House of Representatives from Arkansas's 4th district
- In office January 3, 2001 – January 3, 2013
- Preceded by: Jay Dickey
- Succeeded by: Tom Cotton

Personal details
- Born: Michael Avery Ross; August 2, 1961 (age 65) Texarkana, Arkansas, U.S.
- Party: Democratic
- Spouses: Holly Hempen (m. 1983; div. 2021); Krystal H. Thrailkill (m. 2022)
- Children: 2
- Education: University of Arkansas, Little Rock (BA)

Michael Avery Ross (born August 2, 1961) is an American businessman and politician. A member of the Democratic Party, he served as the U.S. representative for Arkansas's 4th congressional district from 2001 to 2013 and was his party's nominee for governor of Arkansas in 2014. He is currently the last Democrat to have represented Arkansas in the House of Representatives. He was also a member of the Arkansas Senate from 1991 to 2001, a member of the Nevada County Quorum Court from 1983 to 1985, and a small business owner.

After the 2010 midterm elections, Ross became the only white Democratic U.S. Representative from a district in the Deep South. On July 25, 2011, Ross announced that he would not seek reelection to the House in 2012. He instead became the Democratic nominee for governor of Arkansas in the general election scheduled for November 4, 2014. He faced the Republican nominee, former U.S. Representative Asa Hutchinson of Arkansas's 3rd congressional district, who had previously lost the 2006 gubernatorial election to Democrat Mike Beebe. Ross lost to Hutchinson, ending his undefeated electoral streak.

Ross is an officer and senior vice president at Little Rock-based Southwest Power Pool, which manages the electric grid and operates the wholesale electric market for all or parts of 14 states.

== Early life, education, and career ==
Ross was born in Texarkana, Arkansas. A fifth-generation Arkansan, he lived for many years in Prescott until relocating in 2013 to the capital city of Little Rock. The grandson of farmers and a nurse and the son of two public school educators, he graduated from high school in Hope, Arkansas and earned a bachelor's degree from the University of Arkansas at Little Rock, working his way through college as a local radio announcer.

Along with his wife Holly (divorced 2021), who is a pharmacist, they owned and operated a pharmacy and home medical equipment business in his hometown of Prescott, from 1993 until they sold it in 2007.

By the age of 20, Ross was driving and staffing then former governor Bill Clinton as he successfully waged his "come back" campaign for a second term as Governor of Arkansas. During the 1980s, Ross was also vice president for colleges for the Young Democrats of Arkansas and served for many years on the Democratic Party of Arkansas's state committee and its executive committee.

Ross previously served on the Nevada County Quorum Court from 1983 to 1985 and as chief of staff to then-lieutenant governor Winston Bryant from 1985 to 1989.

Ross was a member of the Arkansas State Senate for ten years (1991–2001), before being elected to the U.S. House of Representatives for Arkansas's 4th congressional district in 2000. Ross left Congress on January 3, 2013, after choosing not to seek a seventh term and after a brief stint in the private sector as an officer and senior vice president at the Little Rock-based non-profit Southwest Power Pool, he announced his candidacy for Governor of Arkansas on April 17, 2013. After an unsuccessful bid for governor, he returned to Southwest Power Pool, a regional transmission organization that manages the electric grid and operates the wholesale electric market for all or part of 14 states, where he currently serves as an officer and senior Vice President.

== Arkansas State Senate ==
In 1990, Ross was elected to the Arkansas State Senate becoming the legislature's youngest member at that time, where he served as chair of the Senate Children and Youth Committee. During his tenure, Ross worked alongside future governor Mike Beebe to help pass the Arkansas Academic Challenge scholarship program.

Ross served in the state senate ten years, until his election to the U.S. House of Representatives in 2000.

== U.S. House of Representatives ==
=== Committee assignments ===
- Committee on Energy and Commerce
  - Subcommittee on Commerce, Manufacturing and Trade
  - Subcommittee on Health
  - Subcommittee on Oversight and Investigations
- NATO Parliamentary Assembly

=== Caucus leadership and membership ===
- Blue Dog Coalition (former co-chair)
- Congressional Delta Caucus (former co-chair)
- Congressional Sportsmen's Caucus (former co-chair)
- Mississippi Valley Flood Control Association (former president)
- Interstate 49 Caucus (former co-chair)
- Interstate 69 Caucus (former co-chair)
- Congressional Timber Caucus (former co-chair)
- Congressional Cement Caucus (former co-chair)
- Congressional Community Pharmacy Caucus (former co-chair)
- Congressional Rice Caucus
- Congressional Nursing Caucus
- International Conservation Caucus
- Congressional Arts Caucus
- Congressional Humanities Caucus
- Congressional MS Caucus
- Congressional Rural Caucus
- Congressional Fire Services Caucus
- Congressional Waterways Caucus
- Friends of Job Corps Caucus
- Congressional Historic Preservation Caucus

Ross considered running for the position of Democratic Caucus Vice Chairman for the 110th Congress; however, he deferred to incumbent John Larson after Rahm Emanuel chose to run for caucus chair, which was the position for which Larson had been running.

== Political positions ==
=== Health care ===
Ross has consistently voted against the Patient Protection and Affordable Care Act (also known as Obamacare). He was one of three Democratic representatives to vote to repeal the Affordable Care Act and continued to vote to repeal the law throughout his tenure in Congress.

In a statement after his vote in January 2011, Mike Ross said, "I have said from the beginning that I believe we absolutely need health care reform, but we need commonsense health care reform that reflects Arkansas values. This law was more than 2,000 pages, cut Medicare by half a trillion dollars, placed huge unfunded mandates on our states and authorized the IRS to fine people who can't afford to buy health insurance. An overwhelming majority of my constituents continue to oppose this health care reform law and I believe we should repeal it, start over and listen to the majority of the American people—not the special interests and party leaders in Washington."

Ross supports Arkansas's bipartisan Medicaid expansion known as the "private option" – the state's plan to use federal Medicaid money to pay for private insurance for people earning up to 138 percent of the federal poverty level. Ross said that "although he voted against the Affordable Care Act, he supports the private option, which he called an 'Arkansas-specific, bipartisan and market-based solution' that helps working families. Arkansas' private option is a great example of what we can accomplish when we listen to one another and work together in a bipartisan way, and, as governor, I will support the law and its continued funding."

=== The Blue Dogs and health care ===
On June 19, 2009, Ross made clear that he and a group of other fiscally conservative, moderate Democrats, known as the Blue Dog Coalition, were increasingly unhappy with the direction that health-care legislation was taking in the House. They claimed the health care reform bill was being written behind closed doors without their input and that the proposals being consider fall short in reducing costs and increasing efficiency, outlining only a fraction of what will be required to achieve a product that does not add to the deficit.

Ross was thrust into the national spotlight on July 21 when he and a group of seven Blue Dog Democrats on Energy & Commerce bucked their party's leaders and brought the committee mark up process of H.R. 3200, America's Affordable Health Choices Act of 2009, to a halt. (This piece of legislation would eventually die and never receive a vote on the House floor. H.R. 3962, Affordable Health Care for America Act, is the House health care reform bill that would eventually be considered by the House of Representatives, and Ross voted against that bill.) House Energy and Commerce Committee Chairman Henry Waxman postponed meeting publicly to discuss the health-care legislation to negotiate with the Blue Dogs, meeting privately with Ross and other members of the so-called Blue Dog Coalition, conservative Democrats who sit on the committee and could join Republicans and vote down a bill they don't like since the panel has 36 Democrats and 23 Republicans.

After days of back-to-back meetings and intense negotiations into the night, four of the seven Blue Dog Democrats on the House Energy and Commerce Committee, led by Ross, said they resolved their differences with Chairman Henry Waxman of California and were able to force House leadership to agree on several provisions, namely that the full House would not vote on the legislation until at least September so lawmakers would have time to read the bill and listen to constituents.

Other concessions won by Blue Dogs, which drew immediate opposition from liberals in the chamber, would shave about 10 percent from the health care overhaul's $1 trillion, 10-year price tag, in part by limiting subsidies to people who are not insured. The exemption for small businesses would be doubled so that only businesses with payrolls greater than $500,000 a year would be required to offer insurance or pay a tax equivalent to 8 percent of their payroll.

Because many Blue Dogs, especially Ross, had serious concerns about the bill's potential harmful effects on rural doctors and rural hospitals, the group forced House leadership to accept that the government would negotiate rates with health care providers instead of using Medicare rates in any so-called public option.

However, some of the concessions to Ross set off a revolt among members of the Congressional Progressive Caucus, who said they feared that the public insurance plan was being weakened. "We do not support this," said Representative Lynn Woolsey, Democrat of California, co-chairwoman of the progressive caucus. "It's a nonstarter."

After Congress' August recess, Ross announced that he could not support a bill with a Public Option. In a letter to constituents, he claimed that "An overwhelming number of you oppose a government-run health insurance option, and it is your feedback that has led me to oppose the public option as well." However, a Research 2000 poll, commissioned by the left-leaning group Daily Kos, found that a majority of his district actually supported a Public Option. While a poll from the University of Arkansas only found support for the public option at 39 percent. Ross ultimately voted against the health care reform bill that passed the House on November 7, 2009. In January 2011, Ross was one of three Democrats to vote with the unified Republican caucus for the repeal of the recent health care reform law.

=== Other issues ===
Ross co-sponsored and voted for the Federal Reserve Transparency Act to audit the Federal Reserve System.

Ross is against gun control and is one of the few Democratic members of Congress to consistently earn an "A+" grade from the NRA Political Victory Fund.

Throughout his time in the U.S. House of Representatives, Ross was consistently ranked as one of the most independent and moderate members of Congress by National Journal. When Ross left Congress in 2013, he was ranked as the sixth-most conservative Democrat in the entire U.S. House of Representatives.

== Political campaigns ==
Ross won a narrow victory against incumbent Republican Jay Dickey in 2000 by portraying himself as a moderate, like the political tendencies of his district. In contrast, Dickey was seen as controversial because of his comments on stem cell research and homosexuality. Additionally, he had voted to impeach Bill Clinton, which was a highly unpopular move in Clinton's home district. Clinton, who had won the district by wide margins in both of his presidential bids, campaigned on behalf of Ross. Ross was the only Democratic House challenger outside of California to defeat a Republican incumbent in 2000.

Ross easily defeated Dickey in a 2002 rematch, then ran unopposed in 2004. He picked up an easy victory in the 2006 election, defeating the similarly named Republican, real estate executive Joe Ross, 75 percent–25 percent.

In terms of a possible ballot initiative in Arkansas to allow the use of doctor-prescribed medical marijuana, Ross' campaign said "over the next several months, many issues will try to get on the 2014 ballot, and, like every other Arkansan, Mike Ross will carefully review each measure once it's certified and placed on the ballot."

=== 2008 ===
Ross had no Republican opponent but did face Hot Springs lawyer and Green Party candidate Joshua Drake, whom he beat with a decisive 87% of the vote.

During the 2008 presidential campaign, like most Arkansas Democrats, Ross endorsed former U.S. Senator and former First Lady of the United States Hillary Clinton (D-New York) for president.

=== 2010 ===
Winning 58% of the vote, Ross handily defeated Republican nominee Beth Anne Rankin (40%) and Green Party nominee Josh Drake (2%), despite that year's Republican wave. Ross was the only U.S. House member from Arkansas who sought reelection in 2010, as Democrats Robert Marion Berry and Vic Snyder retired, while Republican John Boozman ran successfully for the U.S. Senate. Ross became the only Democrat in Arkansas' House Delegation, as all three open seats were won by Republicans.

=== 2014 gubernatorial campaign ===
On July 25, 2011, Ross announced that he would retire from Congress at the end of 2012. As for possibly running for Governor of Arkansas in 2014, he said: "Whether I run for Governor in 2014 is a decision I have not yet made and won't make until sometime after my term in this Congress ends. But I do know if I was re-elected to the U.S. Congress next year, my term in the Congress would overlap with the Governor's race. I believe it would be impossible to successfully run for Governor here at home, while effectively carrying out my congressional duties in Washington."

On May 14, 2012, Ross announced that he would not run for governor in 2014. Instead, he became senior vice president for government affairs and public relations at the Little Rock-based, nonprofit Southwest Power Pool.

However, Ross resigned his position as an officer and senior vice president with Southwest Power Pool on April 2, 2013, to "pursue another opportunity in public service." Ross said he received numerous calls and e-mails from all over the state to reconsider his decision not to run for governor and on April 17, 2013, Ross formally announced his campaign for governor in his hometown of Prescott.

On April 29, 2013, Ross tweeted that he had raised more than half a million dollars in the first ten days of the campaign.

During his campaign for governor, Ross made access to quality pre-kindergarten education a centerpiece of his campaign, introducing a plan to make pre-kindergarten accessible to every 4-year-old in Arkansas by 2025.

Ross also made reducing domestic violence and child abuse priorities in his crime reduction plan, which included increased support for shelters, more investigative money for child abuse and more training of police officers in coping with domestic situations. One key initiative in Ross' plan would have changed the way police respond to domestic violence calls. Under Ross's plan, Arkansas police would have been trained to screen victims for risk level by asking a series of research-based questions. If the victim was determined to be at high risk, police would have been required to inform her about the danger she is in, encourage her to seek help and connect her with key resources. Ross' plan also included the creation of a confidential address program to help survivors of sexual assault, rape, stalking or domestic violence keep their location secret from abusers; changing the law so it's easier for domestic violence survivors to terminate a housing lease without penalty; and directing the state to publish a comprehensive report on domestic violence every two years.

Ross also proposed a major overhaul of the state's personal income tax structure and said the plan would have to be phased in over time as allowed by the state's finances. The total price tag of the restructuring would cost an estimated $574.5 million, according to the Arkansas Department of Finance and Administration. Ross said his tax cut plan, when fully implemented, would cut income taxes by as much as $465 for incomes at $30,000; $665 at $40,000; $880 at $50,000; and, $1,148 at $75,000 and up. He proposed mimicking Gov. Mike Beebe's phase-out of the sales tax on groceries as his blueprint for restructuring the tax code. Ross said, "I want to modernize our income tax code in a way that means lower, fairer taxes for working families and small businesses in Arkansas, and I want to do so in a fiscally responsible way that maintains our balanced budget and protects vital state services like education, Medicaid and public safety," Ross said. "Just like Governor Beebe did with the sales tax on groceries, I will also gradually phase in my tax cut plan as the state can afford to do so." The crux of Ross' plan would be to retroactively index Arkansas income tax brackets taking a 1997 state law and applying it to the 1971 realignment of the tax code. Act 328 of 1997 tied state income tax brackets to inflation on a forward-going basis.

Ross also announced a plan to create a "senior bill of rights," which would result in services for seniors centered on seven policy areas, including healthcare, food security and more simple access to information about government programs.

== Electoral history ==
=== U.S. House of Representatives ===
Arkansas's 4th Congressional District House Election, 2000
Party	Candidate	Votes	%	±%
Democratic	Mike Ross	108,143	50.97%	
Republican	Jay Dickey (incumbent)	104,017	49.03%	
Turnout			100%	
Democratic gain from Republican				

Arkansas's 4th Congressional District House Election, 2002
Party	Candidate	Votes	%	±%
Democratic	Mike Ross (incumbent)	119,633	60.56%	+9.59%
Republican	Jay Dickey	77,904	39.44%	−9.59%
Turnout			100%	
Democratic hold				

Arkansas's 4th Congressional District House Election, 2004
Party	Candidate	Votes	%	±%
Democratic	Mike Ross (incumbent)		100.00%	+39.44%
Turnout			100%	
Democratic hold				

Arkansas's 4th Congressional District House Election, 2006
Party	Candidate	Votes	%	±%
Democratic	Mike Ross (incumbent)	128,236	74.73%	−25.27%
Republican	Joe Ross	43,360	25.27%	+25.27%
Turnout			100%	
Democratic hold				

Arkansas's 4th Congressional District House Election, 2008
Party	Candidate	Votes	%	±%
Democratic	Mike Ross (incumbent)	203,178	86.17%	+11.14%
Green	Joshua Drake	32,603	13.83%	+13.83%
Turnout			100%	
Democratic hold				

Arkansas's 4th Congressional District House Election, 2010
Party	Candidate	Votes	%	±%
Democratic	Mike Ross (incumbent)	102,479	57.53%	−28.64%
Republican	Beth Anne Rankin	71,526	40.15%	+40.15%
Green	Joshua Drake	4,129	2.32%	−11.51%
Turnout			100%	
Democratic hold				

== Personal life ==
Mike was married to the former Holly Hempen of Texarkana, Texas in 1983. They had two children. They were divorced in 2021. He married Krystal H. Thrailkill on August 6, 2022. He is a member of Pulaski Heights United Methodist Church in Little Rock, Arkansas where he has resided since 2012.

U.S. House of Representatives
Preceded by Jay Dickey	Member of the U.S. House of Representatives from Arkansas's 4th congressional district 2001–2013	Succeeded by Tom Cotton
Party political offices
Preceded by Dennis Cardoza	Chair of the Blue Dog Coalition for Communications; 2007–2009; Served alongside: Allen Boyd (Administration), Dennis Moore (Policy)	Succeeded by Charlie Melancon
Preceded by Jim Matheson	Chair of the Blue Dog Coalition for Communications; 2011–2013; Served alongside: Heath Shuler (Administration), John Barrow (Policy)	Succeeded by Kurt Schrader
Preceded by Mike Beebe	Democratic nominee for Governor of Arkansas; 2014	Succeeded by Jared Henderson
U.S. order of precedence (ceremonial)
Preceded by Billy Long as Former U.S. Representative	Order of precedence of the United States as Former U.S. Representative	Succeeded by Dennis Hertel as Former U.S. Representative
