= 2008 Arkansas Republican presidential primary =

- February 5, 2008

34 delegates to the Republican National Convention (31 pledged, 3 unpledged)

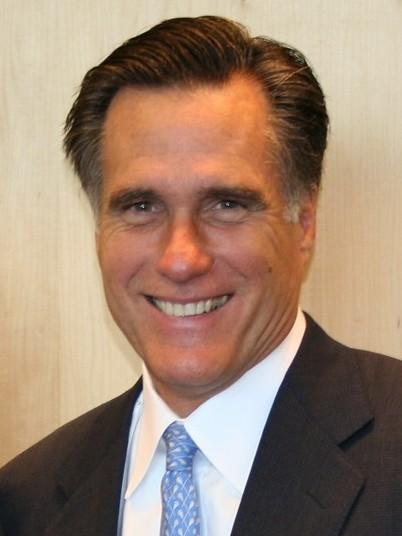
Candidate	Mike Huckabee	John McCain	Mitt Romney
Home state	Arkansas	Arizona	Massachusetts
Delegate count	29	1	1
Popular vote	138,557	46,343	30,997
Percentage	60.46%	20.22%	13.53%
- Election results by county. Mike Huckabee

The 2008 Arkansas Republican presidential primary took place on February 5, 2008, with 31 national delegates.

Former Governor of Arkansas Mike Huckabee was the winner of this Primary.

== Results ==
Official results
Candidate	Votes	Percentage	Delegates
Mike Huckabee	138,557	60.46%	29
John McCain	46,343	20.22%	1
Mitt Romney	30,997	13.53%	1
Ron Paul	10,983	4.79%	0
Rudy Giuliani	658	0.29%	0
Fred Thompson	628	0.27%	0
Uncommitted	987	0.43%	0
Total	229,153	100%	34*

* Includes 31 delegates from February 5 primary results, plus 3 unpledged RNC member delegates

== See also ==
- 2008 Republican Party presidential primaries
- 2008 Arkansas Democratic presidential primary
