= 2008 Arkansas Democratic presidential primary =

- February 5, 2008

47 Democratic National Convention delegates (35 pledged, 12 unpledged) The number of pledged delegates received is determined by the popular vote

Candidate	Hillary Clinton	Barack Obama
Home state	New York	Illinois
Delegate count	27	8
Popular vote	220,136	82,476
Percentage	70.05%	26.25%
- Primary results by county Clinton: 40–50% 50–60% 60–70% 70–80% 80–90% Obama: 40–50% 50–60%

The 2008 Arkansas Democratic presidential primary took place on Super Tuesday, February 5, 2008, with 35 delegates at stake. The winner in each of Arkansas's four congressional districts was awarded all of that district's delegates, totaling 22. Another 13 delegates were awarded to the statewide winner, Hillary Clinton. The 35 delegates represented Arkansas at the Democratic National Convention in Denver, Colorado. Twelve other unpledged delegates, known as superdelegates, also attended the convention and cast their votes as well.

== Results ==
2008 Arkansas Democratic Presidential Primary Results
Party	Candidate	Votes	Percentage	Delegates
Democratic	Hillary Clinton	220,136	70.05%	27
Democratic	Barack Obama	82,476	26.25%	8
Democratic	John Edwards	5,873	1.87%	0
Democratic	Uncommitted	3,398	1.08%	0
Democratic	Others	1,541	0.49%	0
Democratic	Bill Richardson	810	0.26%	0
Totals		314,234	100.00%	35
Voter turnout		%		—

== Analysis ==
Arkansas, the state where Hillary Clinton served as First Lady during her husband Bill Clinton’s tenure as governor, gave Clinton her largest victory during the course of the Democratic Primary. She swept the state among every major demographic – age, gender, religion, income, and educational attainment. According to exit polls, 80 percent of voters in the Arkansas Democratic Primary were Caucasian and they opted for Clinton by a margin of 79–16 compared to the 17 percent of African Americans who backed Obama by a margin of 74–25.

Clinton carried every county in Arkansas by nearly two-to-one margins with the exception of three counties won by Obama: Crittenden, which contains West Memphis and is a part of the Memphis Metropolitan Area; and Lee and Phillips counties, both predominantly African American and located along the Mississippi River Delta.

== See also ==
- 2008 Arkansas Republican presidential primary
