= Vic Snyder =

American politician (born 1947)

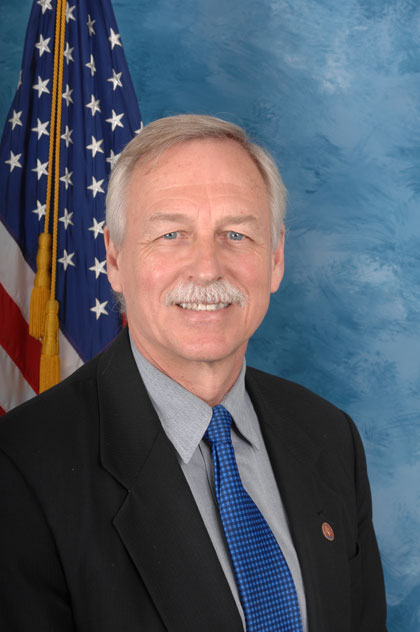

Member of the U.S. House of Representatives from Arkansas's 2nd district
- In office January 3, 1997 – January 3, 2011
- Preceded by: Ray Thornton
- Succeeded by: Tim Griffin

Member of the Arkansas Senate
- In office January 14, 1991 – January 3, 1997
- Preceded by: Doug Brandon
- Succeeded by: Phil Wyrick
- Constituency: 23rd district (1991–1993); 16th district (1993–1997)

Personal details
- Born: Victor Frederick Snyder; September 27, 1947 (age 78) Medford, Oregon, U.S.
- Party: Democratic
- Spouse: Betsy Singleton
- Children: 4
- Education: Willamette University (BA); Oregon Health and Science University (MD); University of Arkansas, Little Rock (JD)

Military service
- Branch/service: United States Marine Corps
- Years of service: 1967–1969
- Rank: Corporal
- Unit: 1st Marine Division
- Battles/wars: Vietnam War

Victor Frederick Snyder (born September 27, 1947) is an American physician, lawyer, and politician who was the U.S. representative for Arkansas's 2nd congressional district from 1997 to 2011. He is a member of the Democratic Party. He served in the United States Marine Corps during the Vietnam War at the rank of corporal.

== Early life, education and career ==
Vic Snyder was born in Medford, Oregon. He is a graduate of Medford High School (1965) and attended college at Willamette University in Salem, Oregon, where he was a member of Kappa Sigma. In 1967, after two years of college, Snyder volunteered for the United States Marine Corps. He served in South Vietnam with Headquarters Company of the US 1st Marine Division during the Vietnam War. He served for two years and attained the rank of corporal. Snyder earned a degree in Chemistry in 1975 from Willamette and earned his M.D. degree from the University of Oregon Health Sciences Center (now Oregon Health & Science University) in Portland, Oregon in 1979.

Snyder moved to Little Rock, Arkansas, and served his residency at the University of Arkansas for Medical Sciences. In 1982 after completing his residency he worked as a family practice physician for 15 years. During this time he travelled overseas to volunteer his medical services at Cambodian refugee camps in Thailand, Salvadoran refugee camps in Honduras, and Ethiopian refugee camps in Sudan, as well as a Catholic mission hospital in Sierra Leone. From 1985 to 1988 Snyder attended the University of Arkansas at Little Rock School of Law to obtain his J.D. degree while still maintaining his medical practice.

== Arkansas Senate ==
In 1990, Snyder successfully ran for a seat in the Arkansas Senate and served in that body until 1996. In the Arkansas Senate, Snyder stepped into one of his earliest legislative controversies when he attempted to repeal the state's aged "Sodomy Laws". Ultimately, however, his efforts failed, and the sodomy laws stayed in effect until the state Supreme Court struck it down in Jegley v. Picado in March 2001. He also challenged the power of the Arkansas Highway Commission.

== U.S. House of Representatives ==
=== Committee assignments ===
- Committee on Armed Services
  - Subcommittee on Oversight and Investigations (Chair)
  - Subcommittee on Military Personnel
- Committee on Veterans' Affairs
  - Subcommittee on Health
- Joint Economic Committee

Snyder focuses on many traditionally liberal issues, including a particular interest in support for veteran's and military families. He has a fairly liberal voting record for being an elected politician from the South and otherwise conservative-leaning Arkansas. Snyder voted against the Federal Marriage Amendment, restrictions on abortion, banning lawsuits against gun manufacturers and distributors, bankruptcy reform, drilling in ANWR, and on October 10, 2002, he was among the 133 members of the House who voted against authorizing the invasion of Iraq; despite this, he regularly voted to fund the needs of soldiers stationed in Iraq. In addition, Snyder was one of only two Congressmen to vote against prosecuting Saddam Hussein.

On issues of free and expanded trade, Snyder differs with his party, especially his Southern populist colleagues. He has also opposed legislation cracking down on Wal-Mart, which is headquartered in Bentonville, Arkansas.

== Political campaigns ==
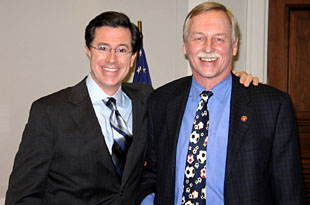
Comedian Stephen Colbert with Snyder, whose district became "Better Known" on February 15, 2007

Snyder was elected to the U.S. House of Representatives in 1996 and was reelected in 1998, 2000, 2002, 2004, 2006, and 2008.

Snyder announced on January 15, 2010 that he would retire at the conclusion of his term which ended in 2010. A SurveyUSA poll released January 15, 2010 showed him trailing his Republican challenger, Tim Griffin, by 17 points, although this was early in the polling cycle.

During the 2008 presidential campaign, like most Arkansas Democrats, Snyder endorsed former U.S. Senator and former First Lady of Arkansas Hillary Clinton (D-New York) for President.

== Electoral history ==
Arkansas's 2nd Congressional District House Election, 1996
Party	Candidate	Votes	%	±%
Democratic	Vic Snyder	114,841	52.35%	
Republican	Bud Cummins	104,548	47.65%	

Arkansas's 2nd Congressional District House Election, 1998
Party	Candidate	Votes	%	±%
Democratic	Vic Snyder	100,334	57.97%	+5.62%
Republican	Phil Wyrick	72,737	42.03%	−5.62%

Arkansas's 2nd Congressional District House Election, 2000
Party	Candidate	Votes	%	±%
Democratic	Vic Snyder	126,957	57.54%	−0.43%
Republican	Bob Thomas	93,692	42.46%	+0.43%

Arkansas's 2nd Congressional District House Election, 2002
Party	Candidate	Votes	%	±%
Democratic	Vic Snyder	142,752	92.92%	+35.38%
Independent	Ed Garner	10,874	7.08%	+7.08%

Arkansas's 2nd Congressional District House Election, 2004
Party	Candidate	Votes	%	±%
Democratic	Vic Snyder	157,419	58.00%	−34.92%
Republican	Marvin Parks	113,968	42.00%	+42.00%

Arkansas's 2nd Congressional District House Election, 2006
Party	Candidate	Votes	%	±%
Democratic	Vic Snyder	124,705	60.54%	+2.54%
Republican	Andy Mayberry	81,288	39.46%	−2.54%

Arkansas's 2nd Congressional District House Election, 2008
Party	Candidate	Votes	%	±%
Democratic	Vic Snyder	212,303	76.54%	+16.00%
Green	Deb McFarland	64,398	23.22%	+23.22%
Independent	Danial Suits	665	0.24%	+0.24%

== Personal life ==
In 2003, Snyder married Betsy Singleton, then a United Methodist minister at Little Rock's Quapaw Quarter United Methodist Church. They have four sons.

Snyder’s congressional papers are housed at the University of Arkansas at Little Rock’s Center for Arkansas History and Culture.

U.S. House of Representatives
Preceded by Ray Thornton	Member of the U.S. House of Representatives from Arkansas's 2nd congressional district 1997–2011	Succeeded by Tim Griffin
U.S. order of precedence (ceremonial)
Preceded by Ronnie Flippo as Former U.S. Representative	Order of precedence of the United States as Former U.S. Representative	Succeeded by Mike Rogers as Former U.S. Representative
