= Marion Berry =

American politician (1942–2023)

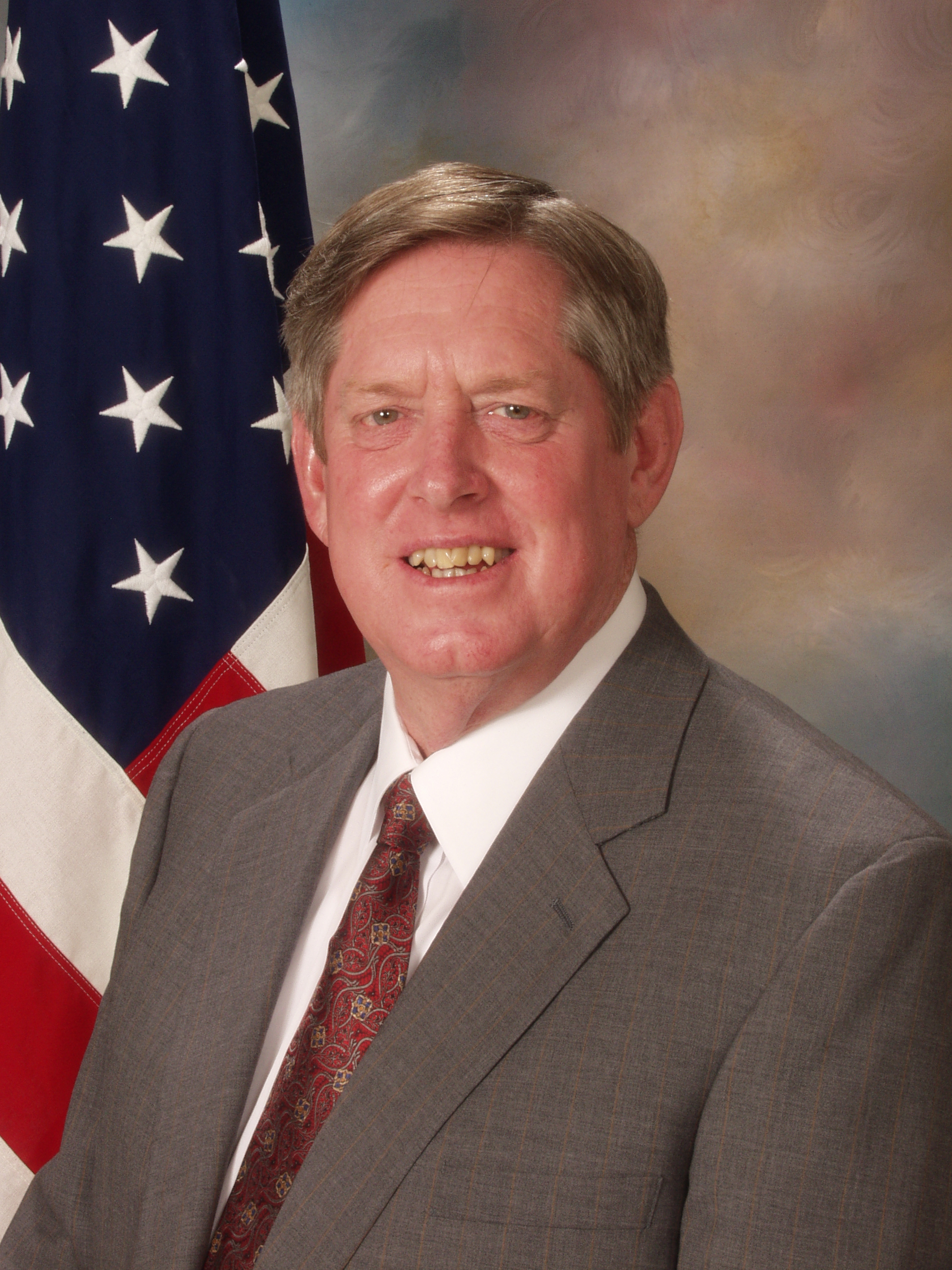

Member of the U.S. House of Representatives from Arkansas's 1st district
- In office January 3, 1997 – January 3, 2011
- Preceded by: Blanche Lincoln
- Succeeded by: Rick Crawford

Personal details
- Born: August 27, 1942 Stuttgart, Arkansas, U.S.
- Died: May 19, 2023 (aged 80) Little Rock, Arkansas, U.S.
- Party: Democratic
- Spouse: Carolyn Berry
- Education: University of Arkansas
- Occupation: Farmer, pharmacist
- Marion Berry's voice Berry speaks on naming a federal Post Office building after former senator Hattie Caraway; Recorded February 8, 2006

Robert Marion Berry (August 27, 1942 – May 19, 2023) was an American politician who was the U.S. representative for Arkansas's 1st congressional district from 1997 to 2011. He was a member of the Democratic Party.

== Early life, family and education ==
Born in Stuttgart, Arkansas, Berry was raised in nearby Bayou Meto, Arkansas County in the Arkansas Delta. The son of a rice farmer, he was encouraged by his parents to work towards a career outside the farm. Moving to Little Rock, he earned a pharmacy degree at the University of Arkansas and then ran a pharmacy for two years.

== Career ==
In 1967, Berry returned to the family business and became a farmer, harvesting soybeans and rice, establishing a business that he carried on until his death in 2023. The family farm holdings have a reported net worth in excess of $1 million.

Berry was elected to a position as a city alderman in Gillett, Arkansas, in 1976. He was appointed a member of the Arkansas Soil and Water Conservation Commission by Governor Bill Clinton in 1986, and continued in that role until 1994. In 1993, then US President Bill Clinton went on to appoint Berry as a member of the White House Domestic Policy Council (1993–1996) and special assistant to the President for Agricultural Trade and Food Assistance (1993–1996).

== U.S. House of Representatives ==
=== Committee assignments ===
- Committee on Appropriations
  - Subcommittee on Energy and Water Development
  - Subcommittee on Homeland Security
  - Subcommittee on Transportation, Housing and Urban Development, and Related Agencies
- Committee on the Budget

=== Caucuses ===
- House Democratic Health Care Task Force (Co-Chair)
- House Affordable Medicine Task Force (Co-Chair)
- Congressional Soybean Caucus (Co-Chair)
- New Madrid Working Group (Co-Chair)

Berry was appointed to the House Appropriations Committee and served on the Military Construction and Veterans Affairs, Energy and Water, and Transportation subcommittees. He was also chosen by Democratic Leadership to serve as vice-chair of the steering and policy committees of the United States House of Representatives and as a member of the Leader's Senior Whip Team.

Berry was a self-described Blue Dog Democrat, and voted against the 2001 tax cuts.

Berry had a seat on the House Appropriations Committee. He co-founded the Democrats' Prescription Drug Task Force and pursued his interests in health care policy while in the Congress. As one of the three House Democrats that sat on the House–Senate conference committee on the Medicare/prescription drug bill in 2003, he voiced many complaints about the administration's healthcare policies. Berry voted for the Democratic health care reform bill, HR 3962, during its first House floor vote. He also voted for the Troubled Assets Relief Program and the American Recovery and Reinvestment Act.

Berry visited Cuba with Blanche Lincoln to promote the removal of the trade embargo to create more markets for Arkansas agricultural products. He drew some controversy when he supported the dumping of nuclear waste from Entergy Corporation reactors into the Arkansas River. Berry also made headlines when he called Rep. Adam Putnam (R-Florida) a "Howdy Doody looking nimrod" while on the House floor.

On October 10, 2002, Marion Berry was among the 81 House Democrats who voted in favor of authorizing the invasion of Iraq.

Berry was the only Democrat to vote against the GIVE Act, an act which could expand the AmeriCorps program.

On March 21, 2010, Berry joined 33 other Democrats and 178 Republicans and voted no on the Patient Protection and Affordable Care Act.

Berry was one of four Democrats to vote against the James Zadroga 9/11 Health and Compensation Act, joining 155 of 159 Republicans, blocking the vote (which needed a 2/3 majority to pass, as it was brought to vote under a motion to suspend rules).

== Political campaigns ==
Returning to Arkansas in 1996, Berry announced his intention to run for the 1st District seat being vacated by Blanche Lincoln. With tough opposition from more progressive candidates, Berry narrowly won the primary with 52% of the vote, thanks to aggressive campaigning in the rural areas north of the Mississippi Delta region. In a district that had up to that time never elected a Republican, and with Berry outspending his opponent two-to-one in the general election, attorney Warren Dupwe, he claimed a modest victory (53%–44%) that November. He declined to run for statewide office, citing health, family responsibilities, and unspecified social issues. However, he enjoyed easy re-election from 1996 on, carrying the district 67%–33% in 2004, and then running unopposed in 2008, while receiving support from donors and groups also opposing the Barack Obama presidential campaign that year. He decided not to stand for re-election in 2010.

During the 2008 presidential campaign, like most Arkansas Democrats, Berry endorsed U.S. Senator and former First Lady of Arkansas Hillary Clinton for President.

== Personal life and death ==
Berry resided in Gillett, Arkansas, with his wife Carolyn. He identified as a Methodist.

Berry died in Little Rock on May 19, 2023, at age 80.

== Electoral history ==
Arkansas's 1st Congressional District House Election, 1996
Party	Candidate	Votes	%	±%
Democratic	Robert Marion Berry	105,280	52.79%	
Republican	Warren Dupwe	88,436	44.34%	
Reform	Keith Carle	5,734	2.88%	

Arkansas's 1st Congressional District House Election, 1998
Party	Candidate	Votes	%	±%
Democratic	Robert Marion Berry		100.00%	+47.21%

Arkansas's 1st Congressional District House Election, 2000
Party	Candidate	Votes	%	±%
Democratic	Robert Marion Berry	120,266	60.15%	−39.85%
Republican	Susan Myshka	79,437	39.73%	+39.73%
Independent	George Moody	253	0.13%	+0.13%

Arkansas's 1st Congressional District House Election, 2002
Party	Candidate	Votes	%	±%
Democratic	Robert Marion Berry	129,701	66.84%	+6.69%
Republican	Tommy F. Robinson	64,357	33.16%	−6.57%

Arkansas's 1st Congressional District House Election, 2004
Party	Candidate	Votes	%	±%
Democratic	Robert Marion Berry	162,388	66.57%	−0.27%
Republican	Vernon Humphrey	81,556	33.43%	+0.27%

Arkansas's 1st Congressional District House Election, 2006
Party	Candidate	Votes	%	±%
Democratic	Robert Marion Berry	127,577	69.27%	+2.70%
Republican	Mickey D. Stumbaugh	56,611	30.74%	−2.69%

Arkansas's 1st Congressional District House Election, 2008
Party	Candidate	Votes	%	±%
Democratic	Robert Marion Berry		100.00%	+30.73%

U.S. House of Representatives
Preceded by Blanche Lincoln	Member of the U.S. House of Representatives from Arkansas's 1st congressional district 1997–2011	Succeeded by Rick Crawford
