= 2020 United States House of Representatives elections in Arkansas =

- November 3, 2020

All 4 Arkansas seats to the United States House of Representatives
| | Majority party | Minority party |
|---|---|---|
| Party | Republican | Democratic |
| Last election | 4 | 0 |
| Seats won | 4 | 0 |
| Seat change | Steady | Steady |
| Popular vote | 828,266 | 330,485 |
| Percentage | 70.23% | 28.02% |
| Swing | ▲7.67% | ▼7.17% |

Republican
50–60%
60–70%
70–80%
80–90%
90–100%
Democratic
50–60%

The 2020 United States House of Representatives elections in Arkansas were held on November 3, 2020, to elect the four U.S. representatives from the state of Arkansas, one from each of the state's four congressional districts. The elections coincided with the 2020 U.S. presidential election, as well as other elections to the House of Representatives, elections to the United States Senate, and various state and local elections.

== Overview ==
Popular vote
| Republican | 70.23% |
| Democratic | 28.02% |
| Libertarian | 1.75% |

House seats
| Republican | 100% |
| Democratic | 0% |

=== District ===
Results of the 2020 United States House of Representatives elections in Arkansas by district:

| District | Republican | | Democratic | | Libertarian | | Total | | Result |
| District | Votes | % | Votes | % | Votes | % | Votes | % | Result |
|---|---|---|---|---|---|---|---|---|---|
| District 1 | 237,596 | 100.00% | 0 | 0.00% | 0 | 0.00% | 237,596 | 100% | Republican hold |
| District 2 | 184,093 | 55.37% | 148,410 | 44.63% | 0 | 0.00% | 332,503 | 100% | Republican hold |
| District 3 | 214,960 | 64.31% | 106,325 | 31.81% | 12,977 | 3.88% | 334,262 | 100% | Republican hold |
| District 4 | 191,617 | 69.67% | 75,750 | 27.54% | 7,668 | 2.79% | 275,035 | 100% | Republican hold |
| Total | 828,266 | 70.23% | 330,485 | 28.02% | 20,645 | 1.75% | 1,179,396 | 100% | |

== District 1 ==
2020 Arkansas's 1st congressional district election
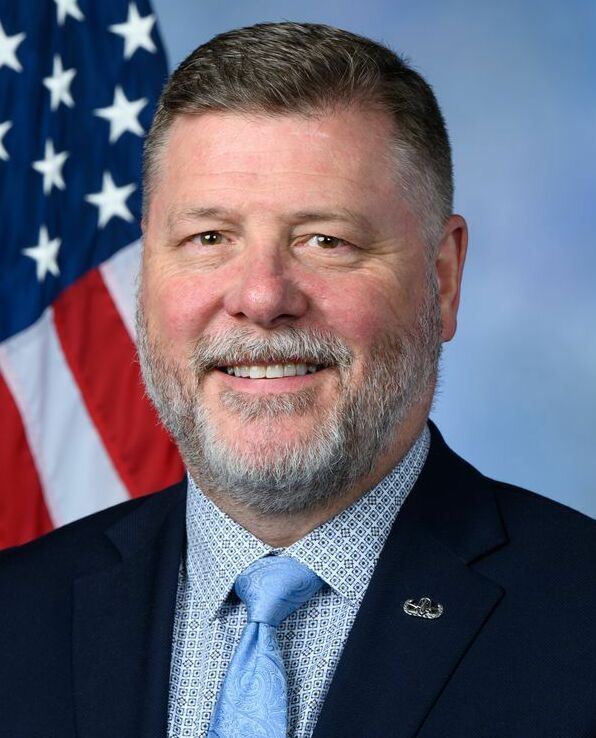
| Nominee | Rick Crawford |
| Party | Republican |
| Popular vote | 237,596 |
| Percentage | 100.0% |
- County results Crawford: 100%
U.S. Representatives before election
Rick Crawford
Republican
Elected U.S. Representatives
Rick Crawford
Republican

The 1st district encompasses northeastern Arkansas, taking in Jonesboro and West Memphis. The incumbent was Republican Rick Crawford, who was re-elected with 68.9% of the vote in 2018.

=== Republican primary ===
==== Candidates ====
===== Declared =====
- Rick Crawford, incumbent U.S. representative

=== General election ===
==== Predictions ====
| Source | Ranking | As of |
|---|---|---|
| The Cook Political Report | Safe R | November 2, 2020 |
| Inside Elections | Safe R | October 28, 2020 |
| Sabato's Crystal Ball | Safe R | November 2, 2020 |
| Politico | Safe R | November 2, 2020 |
| Daily Kos | Safe R | November 2, 2020 |
| RCP | Safe R | November 2, 2020 |

==== Results ====
2020 Arkansas's 1st congressional district election
| Party | Candidate | Votes | % |
|---|---|---|---|
| Republican | Rick Crawford (incumbent) | 237,596 | 100.0 |
| Total votes | | 237,596 | 100.0 |
| Republican hold | | | |

== District 2 ==
2020 Arkansas's 2nd congressional district election
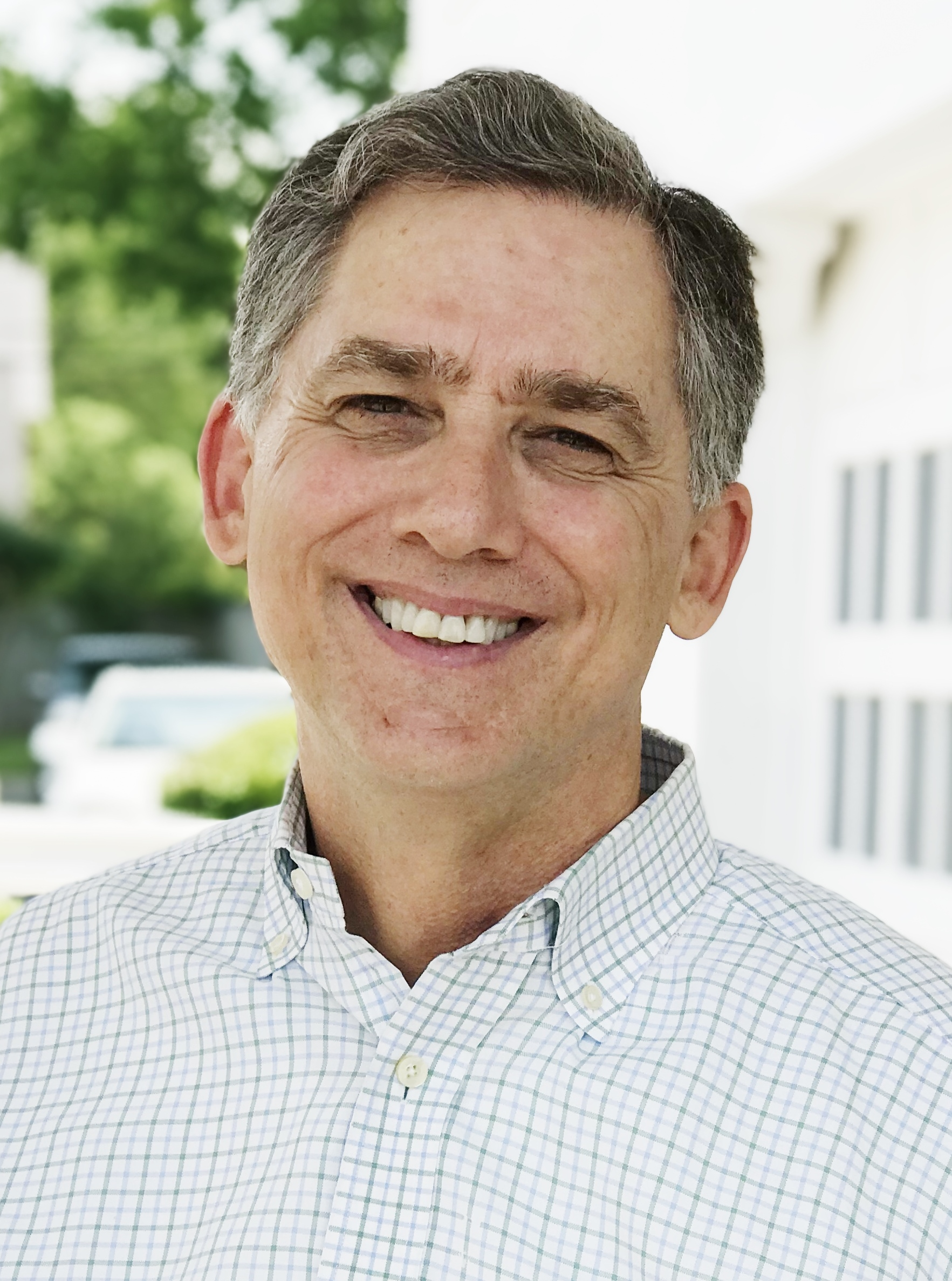

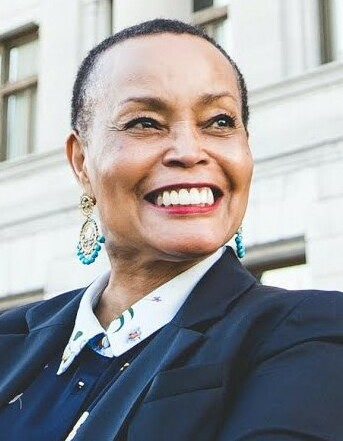
| Nominee | French Hill | Joyce Elliott |
| Party | Republican | Democratic |
| Popular vote | 184,093 | 148,410 |
| Percentage | 55.4% | 44.6% |
- Hill: 50–60% 60–70% 70–80% 80–90% >90% Elliott: 50–60% 60–70% 70–80% 80–90% >90%
U.S. Representatives before election
French Hill
Republican
Elected U.S. Representatives
French Hill
Republican

The 2nd district takes in Central Arkansas, including Little Rock and the surrounding exurbs. The incumbent was Republican French Hill, who was re-elected with 52.1% of the vote in 2018.

=== Republican primary ===
==== Candidates ====
===== Declared =====
- French Hill, incumbent U.S. representative

=== Democratic primary ===
==== Candidates ====
===== Declared =====
- Joyce Elliott, state senator and nominee for this seat in 2010

==== Endorsements ====
Joyce Elliott

Former U.S. executive branch officials

- Joe Biden, 47th vice president of the United States and 2020 Democratic nominee for president
- Barack Obama, former president of the United States (2009-2017, former senator from Illinois (2005-2008)

Organizations

- Congressional Black Caucus
- Democratic Congressional Campaign Committee
- EMILY's List
- Equality PAC
- Human Rights Campaign
- League of Conservation Voters Action Fund
- NARAL Pro-Choice America
- National Association of Social Workers
- National Women's Political Caucus
- Peace Action
- Planned Parenthood Action Fund
- Sierra Club

=== General election ===
==== Debate ====
2020 Arkansas's 2nd congressional district debate
| No. | Date | Host | Moderator | Link | Republican | Democratic |
| Key: P Participant A Absent N Not invited I Invited W Withdrawn | | | | | | |
| Key: P Participant A Absent N Not invited I Invited W Withdrawn | | | | | French Hill | Joyce Elliott |
|---|---|---|---|---|---|---|
| 1 | Oct. 12, 2020 | Arkansas PBS | Steve Barnes | | P | P |

==== Predictions ====
| Source | Ranking | As of |
|---|---|---|
| The Cook Political Report | Tossup | November 2, 2020 |
| Inside Elections | Tossup | October 28, 2020 |
| Sabato's Crystal Ball | Lean R | November 2, 2020 |
| Politico | Lean R | November 2, 2020 |
| Daily Kos | Tossup | November 2, 2020 |
| RCP | Lean R | November 2, 2020 |

==== Polling ====
View source data.

| Poll source | Date(s) administered | Sample size (Note: Key: A – all adults RV – registered voters LV – likely voters V – unclear) | Margin of error | French Hill (R) | Joyce Elliott (D) | Other | Undecided |
|---|---|---|---|---|---|---|---|
| Change Research | October 29 – November 2, 2020 | 586 (LV) | ± 4.5% | 48% | 48% | 4% (Note: "Don't recall" with 3%; Did not vote with 1%; Would not vote with 0%) | 1% |
| ALG Research (D) (Note: Poll sponsored by Elliott's campaign.) | October 16–21, 2020 | 500 (LV) | ± 4.4% | 47% | 47% | – | – |
| Hendrix College | October 11–13, 2020 | 644 (LV) | ± 4.9% | 46% | 46% | – | 9% |
| ALG Research (D) | September 27–29, 2020 | 511 (LV) | ± 4.4% | 48% | 48% | – | – |
| Brilliant Corners Research & Strategies (D) (Note: Poll sponsored by EMILY's List.) | September 10–16, 2020 | 605 (LV) | – | 46% | 48% | – | – |
| ALG Research (D) | September 9–13, 2020 | 511 (LV) (Note: Additional data sourced from FiveThirtyEight) | – | 50% | 46% | – | – |
| Hendrix College/TalkBusiness | September 4–9, 2020 | 698 (LV) | ± 4.3% | 48% | 46% | – | 7% |
| ALG Research (D) | June 18–24, 2020 | 511 (LV) | – | 50% | 43% | – | – |

==== Results ====
2020 Arkansas's 2nd congressional district election
| Party | Candidate | Votes | % |
|---|---|---|---|
| Republican | French Hill (incumbent) | 184,093 | 55.4 |
| Democratic | Joyce Elliott | 148,410 | 44.6 |
| Total votes | | 332,503 | 100.0 |
| Republican hold | | | |

==== By county ====
| County | French Hill Republican | | Joyce Elliott Democratic | | Margin | | Total |
| County | # | % | # | % | # | % | Total |
|---|---|---|---|---|---|---|---|
| Conway | 5,850 | 67.46% | 2,822 | 32.54% | 3,028 | 34.92% | 8,672 |
| Faulkner | 35,279 | 64.98% | 19,017 | 35.02% | 16,262 | 29.95% | 54,296 |
| Perry | 3,542 | 76.87% | 1,066 | 23.13% | 2,476 | 53.73% | 4,608 |
| Pulaski | 68,154 | 40.21% | 101,339 | 59.79% | -33,185 | -19.58% | 169,493 |
| Saline | 40,612 | 71.41% | 16,256 | 28.59% | 24,356 | 42.83% | 56,868 |
| Van Buren | 6,072 | 78.35% | 1,678 | 21.65% | 4,394 | 56.70% | 7,750 |
| White | 24,584 | 79.78% | 6,232 | 20.22% | 18,352 | 59.55% | 30,816 |
| Totals | 184,093 | 55.37% | 148,410 | 44.63% | 35,683 | 10.73% | 332,503 |

== District 3 ==
2020 Arkansas's 3rd congressional district election
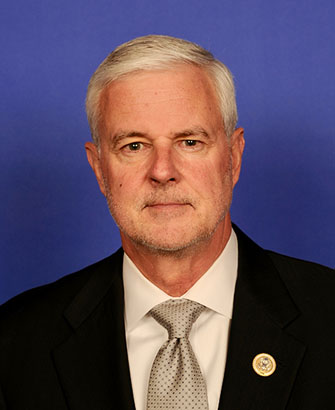

| Nominee | Steve Womack | Celeste Williams |
| Party | Republican | Democratic |
| Popular vote | 214,960 | 106,325 |
| Percentage | 64.3% | 31.8% |
- Womack: 40–50% 50–60% 60–70% 70–80% 80–90% >90% Williams: 40–50% 50–60% 60–70% 70–80% 80–90% Tie: 40–50%
U.S. Representatives before election
Steve Womack
Republican
Elected U.S. Representatives
Steve Womack
Republican

The 3rd district covers northwestern Arkansas, including Bentonville, Fayetteville, Springdale and Fort Smith. The incumbent was Republican Steve Womack, who was re-elected with 64.7% of the vote in 2018.

=== Republican primary ===
==== Candidates ====
===== Declared =====
- Steve Womack, incumbent U.S. representative

=== Democratic primary ===
==== Candidates ====
===== Declared =====
- Celeste Williams, nurse practitioner

=== Other ===
==== Candidates ====
===== Declared =====
- Michael Kalagias (Libertarian), candidate for Arkansas's 3rd congressional district in 2018 and candidate for Arkansas House of Representatives in 2014 and 2016

=== Debate ===
2020 Arkansas's 3rd congressional district debate
| No. | Date | Host | Moderator | Link | Republican | Democratic | Libertarian |
| Key: P Participant A Absent N Not invited I Invited W Withdrawn | | | | | | | |
| Key: P Participant A Absent N Not invited I Invited W Withdrawn | | | | | Steve Womack | Celeste Williams | Michael Kalagias |
|---|---|---|---|---|---|---|---|
| 1 | Oct. 13, 2020 | Arkansas PBS | Steve Barnes | | P | P | P |

==== Predictions ====
| Source | Ranking | As of |
|---|---|---|
| The Cook Political Report | Safe R | November 2, 2020 |
| Inside Elections | Safe R | October 28, 2020 |
| Sabato's Crystal Ball | Safe R | November 2, 2020 |
| Politico | Safe R | November 2, 2020 |
| Daily Kos | Safe R | November 2, 2020 |
| RCP | Safe R | November 2, 2020 |

==== Results ====
2020 Arkansas's 3rd congressional district election
| Party | Candidate | Votes | % |
|---|---|---|---|
| Republican | Steve Womack (incumbent) | 214,960 | 64.3 |
| Democratic | Celeste Williams | 106,325 | 31.8 |
| Libertarian | Michael Kalagias | 12,977 | 3.9 |
| Total votes | | 334,262 | 100.0 |
| Republican hold | | | |

==== By county ====
| County | Steve Womack Republican | | Celeste Williams Democratic | | Michael Kalagias Libertarian | | Margin | | Total |
| County | # | % | # | % | # | % | # | % | Total |
|---|---|---|---|---|---|---|---|---|---|
| Benton | 76,899 | 64.32% | 37,491 | 31.36% | 5,161 | 4.32% | 39,408 | 32.96% | 119,551 |
| Boone | 13,824 | 81.60% | 2,644 | 15.61% | 473 | 2.79% | 11,180 | 65.99% | 16,941 |
| Carroll | 7,588 | 64.84% | 3,813 | 32.58% | 301 | 2.57% | 3,775 | 32.26% | 11,702 |
| Crawford (part) | 13,169 | 76.55% | 3,445 | 20.02% | 590 | 3.43% | 9,724 | 56.52% | 17,204 |
| Marion | 5,908 | 79.52% | 1,327 | 17.86% | 195 | 2.62% | 4,581 | 61.66% | 7,430 |
| Newton (part) | 1,555 | 85.30% | 235 | 12.89% | 33 | 1.81% | 1,320 | 72.41% | 1,823 |
| Pope | 18,479 | 76.01% | 5,117 | 21.05% | 714 | 2.94% | 13,362 | 54.97% | 24,310 |
| Searcy (part) | 224 | 88.54% | 26 | 10.28% | 3 | 1.19% | 198 | 78.26% | 253 |
| Sebastian (part) | 27,307 | 66.08% | 12,337 | 29.85% | 1,680 | 4.07% | 14,970 | 36.23% | 41,324 |
| Washington | 50,007 | 53.36% | 39,890 | 42.56% | 3,827 | 4.08% | 10,117 | 10.79% | 93,724 |
| Totals | 214,960 | 64.31% | 106,325 | 31.81% | 12,977 | 3.88% | 108,635 | 32.50% | 334,262 |

== District 4 ==
2020 Arkansas's 4th congressional district election
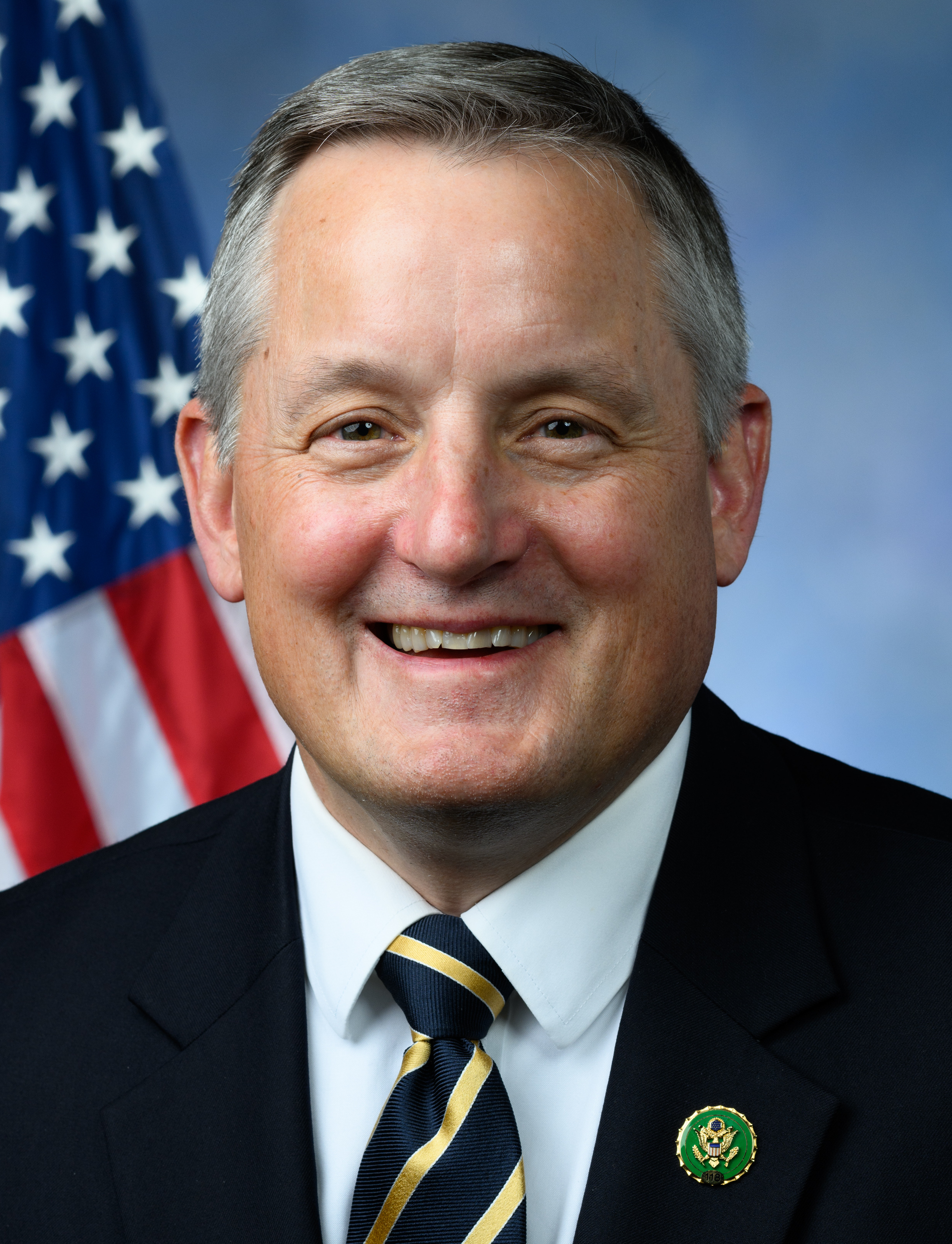

| Nominee | Bruce Westerman | William Hanson |
| Party | Republican | Democratic |
| Popular vote | 191,617 | 75,750 |
| Percentage | 69.7% | 27.5% |
- County results Westerman: 50–60% 60–70% 70–80% 80–90% Hanson: 50–60%
U.S. Representatives before election
Bruce Westerman
Republican
Elected U.S. Representatives
Bruce Westerman
Republican

The 4th district encompasses southwestern Arkansas, taking in Camden, Hope, Hot Springs, Magnolia, Pine Bluff, and Texarkana. The incumbent was Republican Bruce Westerman, who was re-elected with 66.7% of the vote in 2018.

=== Republican primary ===
==== Candidates ====
===== Declared =====
- Bruce Westerman, incumbent U.S. representative

=== Democratic primary ===
==== Candidates ====
===== Declared =====
- William Hanson, former law professor

=== Other ===
==== Candidates ====
===== Declared =====
- Frank Gilbert (Libertarian), former mayor of Tull and former Grant County coroner

=== General election ===
==== Debate ====
2020 Arkansas's 4th congressional district debate
| No. | Date | Host | Moderator | Link | Republican | Democratic | Libertarian |
| Key: P Participant A Absent N Not invited I Invited W Withdrawn | | | | | | | |
| Key: P Participant A Absent N Not invited I Invited W Withdrawn | | | | | Bruce Westerman | Williams Hanson | Frank Gilbert |
|---|---|---|---|---|---|---|---|
| 1 | Oct. 13, 2020 | Arkansas PBS | Steve Barnes | | P | P | P |

==== Predictions ====
| Source | Ranking | As of |
|---|---|---|
| The Cook Political Report | Safe R | November 2, 2020 |
| Inside Elections | Safe R | October 28, 2020 |
| Sabato's Crystal Ball | Safe R | November 2, 2020 |
| Politico | Safe R | November 2, 2020 |
| Daily Kos | Safe R | November 2, 2020 |
| RCP | Safe R | November 2, 2020 |

==== Results ====
2020 Arkansas's 4th congressional district election
| Party | Candidate | Votes | % |
|---|---|---|---|
| Republican | Bruce Westerman (incumbent) | 191,617 | 69.7 |
| Democratic | William Hanson | 75,750 | 27.5 |
| Libertarian | Frank Gilbert | 7,668 | 2.8 |
| Total votes | | 275,035 | 100.0 |
| Republican hold | | | |

==== By county ====
| County | Bruce Westerman Republican | | William Hanson Democratic | | Frank Gilbert Libertarian | | Margin | | Total |
| County | # | % | # | % | # | % | # | % | Total |
|---|---|---|---|---|---|---|---|---|---|
| Ashley | 5,603 | 71.25% | 2,092 | 26.60% | 169 | 2.15% | 3,511 | 44.65% | 7,864 |
| Bradley | 2,398 | 66.43% | 1,124 | 31.14% | 88 | 2.44% | 1,274 | 35.29% | 3,610 |
| Calhoun | 1,649 | 76.80% | 457 | 21.29% | 41 | 1.91% | 1,192 | 55.52% | 2,147 |
| Clark | 4,967 | 59.88% | 3,137 | 37.82% | 191 | 2.30% | 1,830 | 22.06% | 8,295 |
| Cleveland | 2,893 | 81.47% | 581 | 16.36% | 77 | 2.17% | 2,312 | 65.11% | 3,551 |
| Columbia | 5,591 | 66.12% | 2,700 | 31.93% | 165 | 1.95% | 2,891 | 34.19% | 8,456 |
| Crawford (part) | 5,458 | 79.95% | 1,126 | 16.49% | 243 | 3.56% | 4,332 | 63.45% | 6,827 |
| Dallas | 1,615 | 62.09% | 928 | 35.68% | 58 | 2.23% | 687 | 26.41% | 2,601 |
| Drew | 4,447 | 65.03% | 2,221 | 32.48% | 170 | 2.49% | 2,226 | 32.55% | 6,838 |
| Franklin | 5,689 | 80.81% | 1,171 | 16.63% | 180 | 2.56% | 4,518 | 64.18% | 7,040 |
| Garland | 30,747 | 69.92% | 11,800 | 26.83% | 1,428 | 3.25% | 18,947 | 43.09% | 43,975 |
| Grant | 6,763 | 83.09% | 1,112 | 13.66% | 264 | 3.24% | 5,651 | 69.43% | 8,139 |
| Hempstead | 4,528 | 66.88% | 2,094 | 30.93% | 148 | 2.19% | 2,434 | 35.95% | 6,770 |
| Hot Spring | 9,316 | 74.60% | 2,812 | 22.52% | 360 | 2.88% | 6,504 | 52.08% | 12,488 |
| Howard | 3,393 | 71.37% | 1,265 | 26.61% | 96 | 2.02% | 2,128 | 44.76% | 4,754 |
| Jefferson (part) | 9,815 | 40.59% | 13,682 | 56.58% | 686 | 2.84% | -3,867 | -15.99% | 24,183 |
| Johnson | 6,937 | 73.80% | 2,094 | 22.28% | 369 | 3.93% | 4,843 | 51.52% | 9,400 |
| Lafayette | 1,747 | 66.45% | 841 | 31.99% | 41 | 1.56% | 906 | 34.46% | 2,629 |
| Little River | 3,775 | 73.89% | 1,235 | 24.17% | 99 | 1.94% | 2,540 | 49.72% | 5,109 |
| Logan | 6,472 | 79.35% | 1,391 | 17.05% | 293 | 3.59% | 5,081 | 62.30% | 8,156 |
| Madison | 5,496 | 75.61% | 1,521 | 20.92% | 252 | 3.47% | 3,975 | 54.68% | 7,269 |
| Miller | 11,870 | 72.57% | 4,105 | 25.10% | 382 | 2.34% | 7,765 | 47.47% | 16,357 |
| Montgomery | 3,103 | 81.12% | 635 | 16.60% | 87 | 2.27% | 2,468 | 64.52% | 3,825 |
| Nevada | 2,178 | 65.52% | 1,068 | 32.13% | 78 | 2.35% | 1,110 | 33.39% | 3,324 |
| Newton (part) | 1,551 | 74.68% | 461 | 22.20% | 65 | 3.13% | 1,090 | 52.48% | 2,077 |
| Ouachita | 5,443 | 57.32% | 3,854 | 40.59% | 199 | 2.10% | 1,589 | 16.73% | 9,496 |
| Pike | 3,530 | 84.15% | 574 | 13.68% | 91 | 2.17% | 2,956 | 70.46% | 4,195 |
| Polk | 7,019 | 83.50% | 1,089 | 12.96% | 298 | 3.55% | 5,930 | 70.54% | 8,406 |
| Scott | 2,977 | 84.65% | 449 | 12.77% | 91 | 2.59% | 2,528 | 71.88% | 3,517 |
| Sebastian (part) | 4,756 | 84.37% | 700 | 12.42% | 181 | 3.21% | 4,056 | 71.95% | 5,637 |
| Sevier | 3,970 | 77.51% | 1,011 | 19.74% | 141 | 2.75% | 2,959 | 57.77% | 5,122 |
| Union | 10,693 | 65.47% | 5,214 | 31.92% | 426 | 2.61% | 5,479 | 33.55% | 16,333 |
| Yell | 5,228 | 78.68% | 1,206 | 18.15% | 211 | 3.18% | 4,022 | 60.53% | 6,645 |
| Totals | 191,617 | 69.67% | 75,750 | 27.54% | 7,668 | 2.79% | 115,867 | 42.13% | 275,035 |

== See also ==
- 2020 Arkansas elections

== Notes ==
Partisan clients
