= Joyce Elliott =

American politician

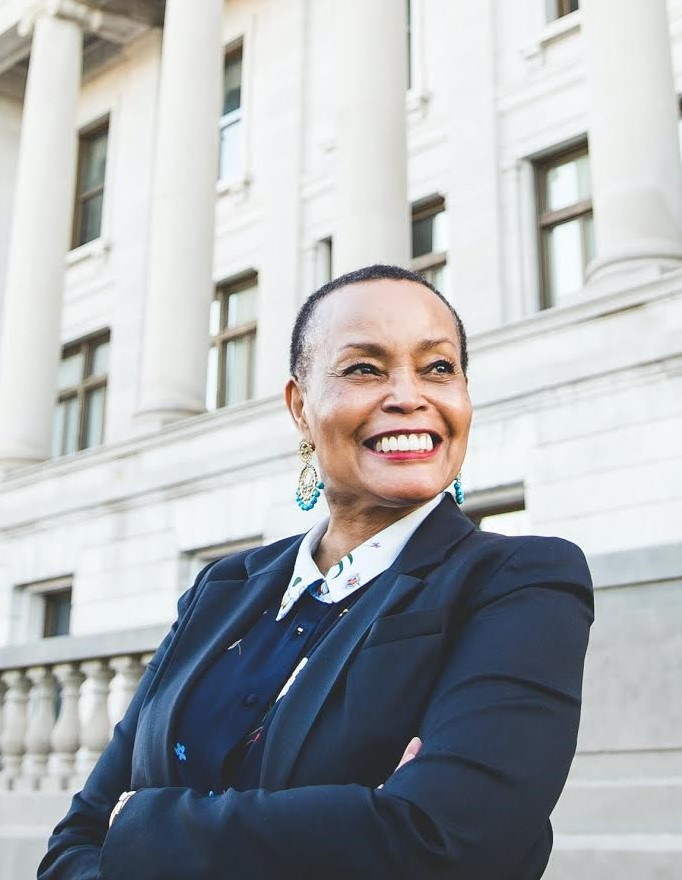

Member of the Arkansas Senate from the 31st district
- In office January 12, 2009 – January 9, 2023
- Preceded by: Irma Hunter Brown
- Succeeded by: Redistricted

Majority Leader of the Arkansas Senate
- In office January 12, 2009 – January 10, 2011
- Preceded by: Tracy Steele
- Succeeded by: Robert F. Thompson

Member of the Arkansas House of Representatives
- In office January 8, 2001 – January 13, 2007
- Preceded by: Michael Booker
- Succeeded by: Fred Allen
- Constituency: 56th district (2001–03); 33rd district (2003–07)

Personal details
- Born: March 20, 1951 (age 75) Willisville, Arkansas, U.S.
- Party: Democratic
- Spouse: Bill Barnes (former)
- Education: Southern Arkansas University (BA); Ouachita Baptist University (MA)

Joyce Ann Elliott (born March 20, 1951) is an American politician from the state of Arkansas. From 2009 to 2022, she was a member of the Arkansas Senate representing the 31st district, which consisted of portions of Little Rock and Pulaski County. She was previously a member of the Arkansas House of Representatives, serving from 2001 to 2007. She is a member of the Democratic Party.

Elliott was the Democratic nominee in the 2010 and 2020 elections for Arkansas's 2nd congressional district, losing the former election to Republican Tim Griffin, and the latter to incumbent Republican French Hill. If elected, she would have been the only African American to ever represent Arkansas in Congress.

== Early life, education, and career ==
Joyce Ann Elliott was born on March 20, 1951, in Willisville, Arkansas. Elliott was the second person of color to graduate from recently integrated Willisville High School in 1969, with her older sister being the first. Elliott graduated from Southern Arkansas University with a Bachelor of Arts in English and speech and then graduated from Ouachita Baptist University with a Master of Arts in English.

Elliott spent four years as the president of the Pulaski County chapter of the National Education Association from 1985 to 1989, later leaving to join and lead the state's American Federation of Teachers chapter in 1992. She taught English at Joe T. Robinson High School from 1989 to 2003.

== Arkansas State legislature ==
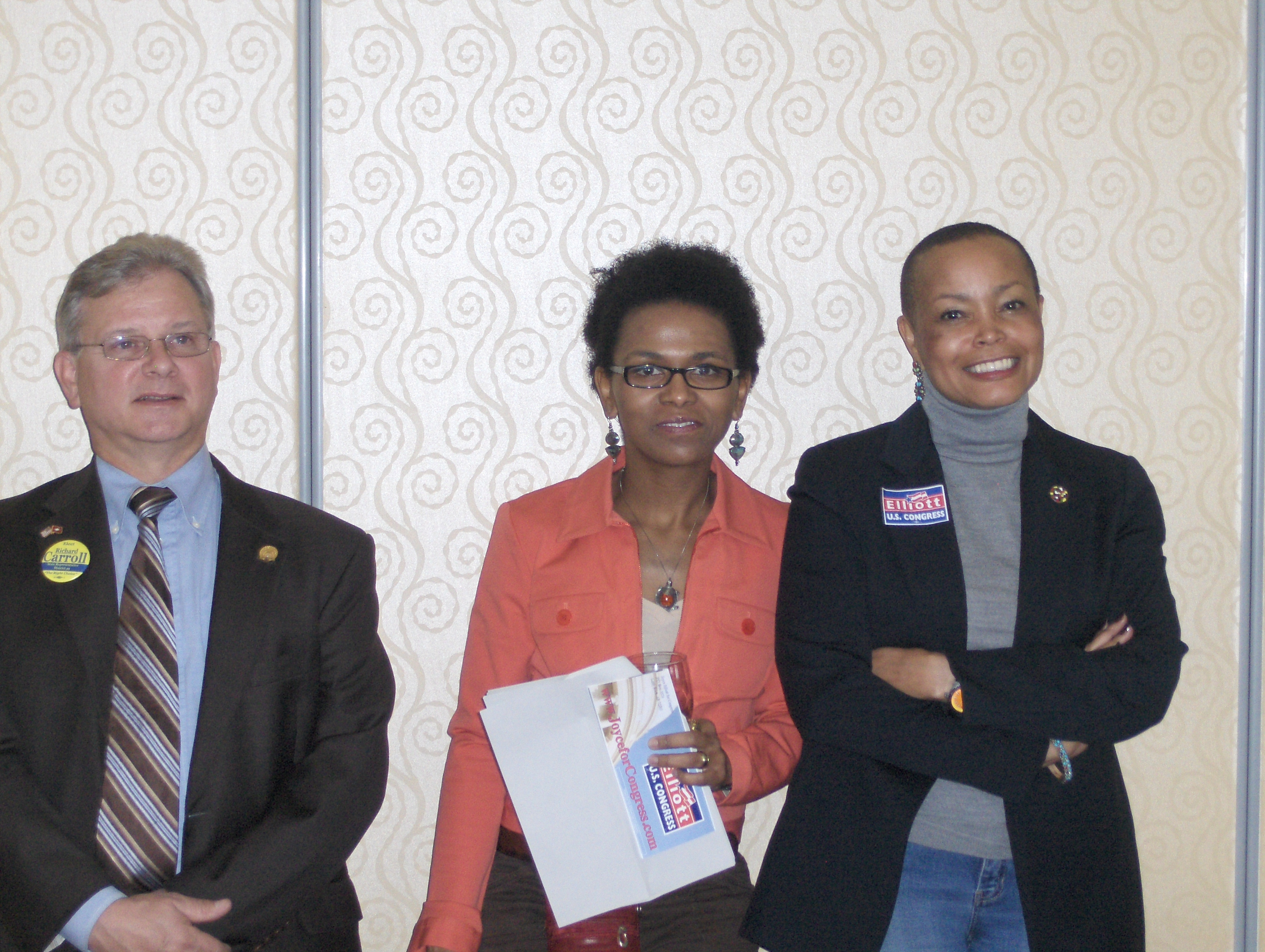
Elliott (right) with Richard Carroll and his wife, Una, in 2010.

Elliott served in the Arkansas House of Representatives from 2000 to 2006. In 2008, she was elected to the Arkansas State Senate, where she represented the 31st district.

Elliott began working on hate crime legislation in 2001 during her first term in office. Arkansas is one of three states without a statute criminalizing various types of bias-motivated violence or intimidation.

In 2020, she was the chair of the Arkansas Legislative Black Caucus.

=== 2020 congressional campaign ===
In 2020, Elliott ran for the United States House of Representatives in Arkansas's 2nd congressional district against Republican incumbent French Hill. Her campaign was endorsed by Joe Biden, Barack Obama, and the Democratic Congressional Campaign Committee. She lost to Hill in the general election with 44.6% of the vote.

== Personal life ==
Elliott was formerly married to Bill Barnes, with whom she has a son, Elliott. In June 2000, she donated a kidney to her sister. In July 2024, Elliott's family stated she had suffered a stroke while on a trip in Dallas, Texas, and was recovering.

== Elections ==
=== 2000 election ===
2000 Arkansas State Representative District 56 Election
Party	Candidate	Votes	%
Democratic	Joyce Elliott	5,556	83
Republican	Herbert L. Broadway	1,104	17
Total Votes:		6,660	100

=== 2010 election ===
Elliott ran against Republican nominee Timothy Griffin for the seat of retiring Democratic incumbent Vic Snyder who retired. In the general election, Elliott lost to Griffin.

2010 Arkansas's 2nd Congressional District Election
Party	Candidate	Votes	%
Republican	Tim Griffin	122,091	57.9
Democratic	Joyce Elliott	80,687	38.27
Green	Lewis Kennedy	3,599	1.71
Independent	Lance Levi	4,421	2.10
	Write-Ins	54	0.03
Total Votes:		210,852	100

=== 2020 election ===
Elliott announced her candidacy for the U.S. House in Arkansas's 2nd congressional district on November 12, 2019, against Republican incumbent French Hill.

2020 Arkansas 2nd Congressional District Election
Party	Candidate	Votes	%
Republican	French Hill	182,248	55.65
Democratic	Joyce Elliot	145,225	44.35
Total Votes:		327,503	100

Arkansas Senate
Preceded by Irma Hunter Brown	Member of the Arkansas Senate from the 31st district 2009–present	Incumbent
Preceded by Tracy Steele	Majority Leader of the Arkansas Senate; 2009–2011	Succeeded by Robert F. Thompson
Arkansas House of Representatives
Preceded by Thomas Moore	Member of the Arkansas House of Representatives from the 33rd district 2003–2007	Succeeded by Fred Allen
Preceded by Michael Booker	Member of the Arkansas House of Representatives from the 56th district 2001–2003	Succeeded by Wayne Nichols
