= Tracy Steele =

American politician

Member of the Arkansas House of Representatives from the 72nd district
- Incumbent
- Assumed office January 13, 2025
- Preceded by: Jamie Aleshia Scott

Member of the Arkansas House of Representatives from the 39th district
- In office January 10, 2011 – January 2013
- Preceded by: Richard Carroll
- Succeeded by: Mark Lowery

Majority Leader of the Arkansas State Senate
- In office January 8, 2007 – January 12, 2009
- Preceded by: Percy Malone
- Succeeded by: Joyce Elliott

Member of the Arkansas Senate from the 34th district
- In office January 13, 2003 – January 10, 2011
- Preceded by: John E. Brown
- Succeeded by: Linda Chesterfield

Member of the Arkansas House of Representatives from the 59th district
- In office January 11, 1999 – January 13, 2003
- Preceded by: Dee Bennett
- Succeeded by: Bill Stovall

Personal details
- Born: December 18, 1963 (age 62)
- Party: Democratic
- Profession: Executive director

Tracy Steele (born December 18, 1963) is an American politician. He is a Democratic former member of the Arkansas Senate for eight years and Arkansas House of Representatives for over seven, currently representing the 72nd District since 2025.

== Personal life ==
Tracy Steele's hometown is in North Little Rock. He is a Baptist. Steele and his wife Cassandra have two children.

== Education ==
Steele received his education at:

- Bachelor's, Political Science, Rice University in Houston, Texas

Steele played on the Rice Owls men's basketball team and completed Governor's School at Duke University.

== Politics ==
He served in the Arkansas Senate in which he was both Majority Leader and Majority Whip. He served in the Arkansas House from 1998 to 2002 for the 59th District.

Steele ran for Mayor of North Little Rock in 2020, and was defeated by former Mayor Terry Hartwick 53.35% to 46.65% in the runoff election.

== Political experience ==
Steele has had the following political experience:

- North Little Rock School Board
- Representative, Arkansas State House of Representatives, 1998–2002, 2011-2013, 2025-present
- Senator, Arkansas State Senate, 2002-2010
- Assistant Pro Tempore, Arkansas State Senate, 2009-2010
- Majority Leader, Arkansas State Senate, 2006-2010
