= French Hill (politician) =

American politician (born 1956)

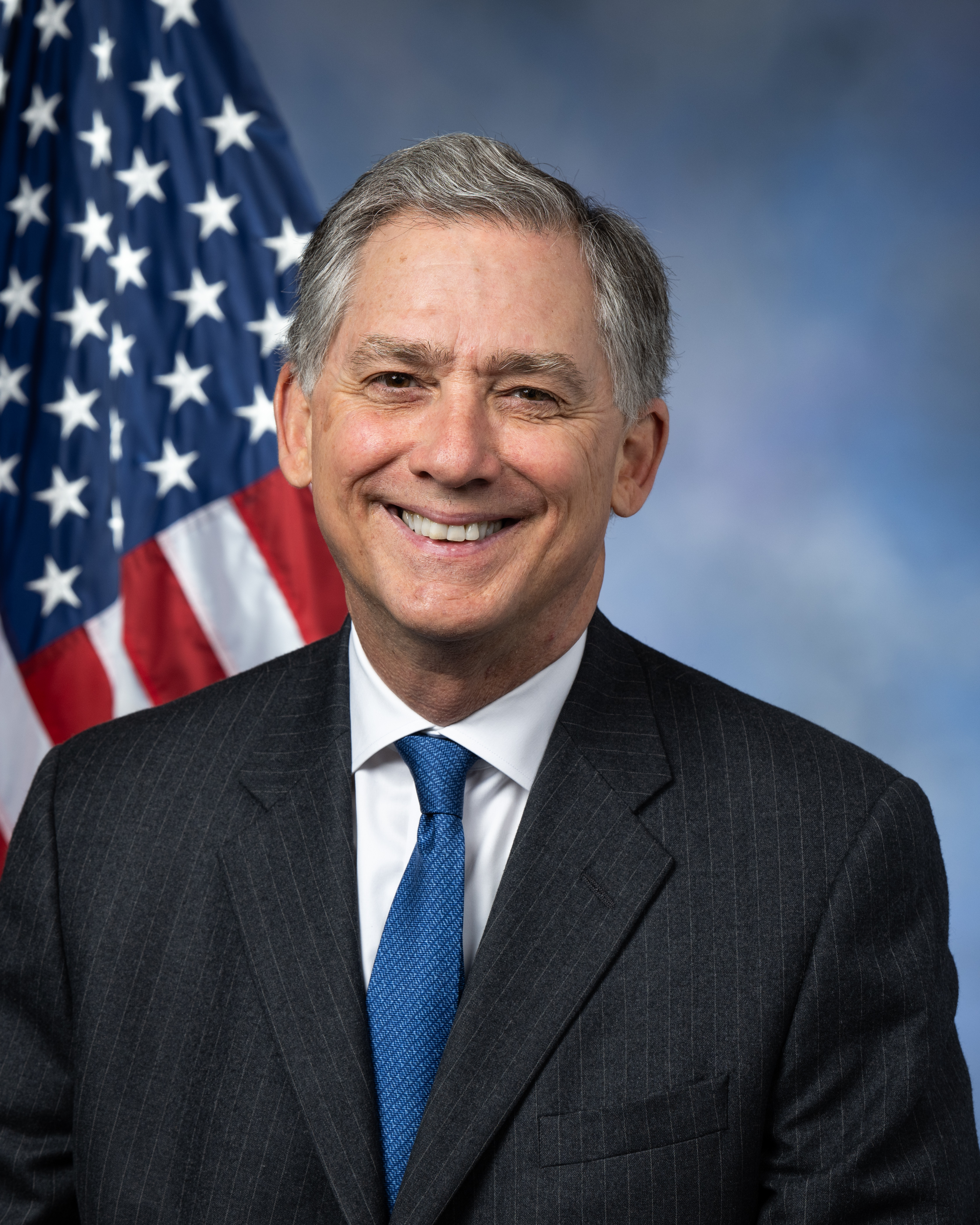
- Official portrait, 2025

Chair of the House Financial Services Committee
- Incumbent
- Assumed office January 3, 2025
- Preceded by: Patrick McHenry

Member of the U.S. House of Representatives from Arkansas's 2nd district
- Incumbent
- Assumed office January 3, 2015
- Preceded by: Tim Griffin

Personal details
- Born: James French Hill; December 5, 1956 (age 69) Little Rock, Arkansas, U.S.
- Party: Republican
- Spouse: Martha McKenzie (m. 1988)
- Children: 2
- Education: Vanderbilt University (BA)
- Website: House website Campaign website
- Hill's voice Hill honoring former Sen. John McCain. Recorded September 6, 2018

James French Hill (born December 5, 1956) is an American businessman and politician serving as the U.S. representative for Arkansas' 2nd congressional district since 2015. He is a member of the Republican Party.

== Early life and education ==
Hill was born in Little Rock, Arkansas. His father, Jay F. Hill ran a Little Rock-based financial firm that he inherited from his father, James "Jay" Wilson Hill. As a teenager, French Hill worked in the family financial firm during the summer months.

Hill graduated with a Bachelor of Arts in economics from Vanderbilt University. He attended the UCLA Anderson Graduate School of Management, where he earned a certified corporate director designation.

== Early political career ==
From 1982 to 1984, Hill was an aide to Republican Senator John Tower. He was a staffer on the Senate Banking, Housing and Urban Affairs Committee. Hill was executive secretary to President George H. W. Bush’s Economic Policy Council from 1991 to 1993, and Deputy Assistant Secretary of the Treasury for Corporate Finance from 1989 to 1991. Hill founded and was CEO and chairman of the Board Delta Trust and Banking Corporation in Little Rock until its acquisition by Simmons Bank in 2014.

== U.S. House of Representatives ==
=== Elections ===
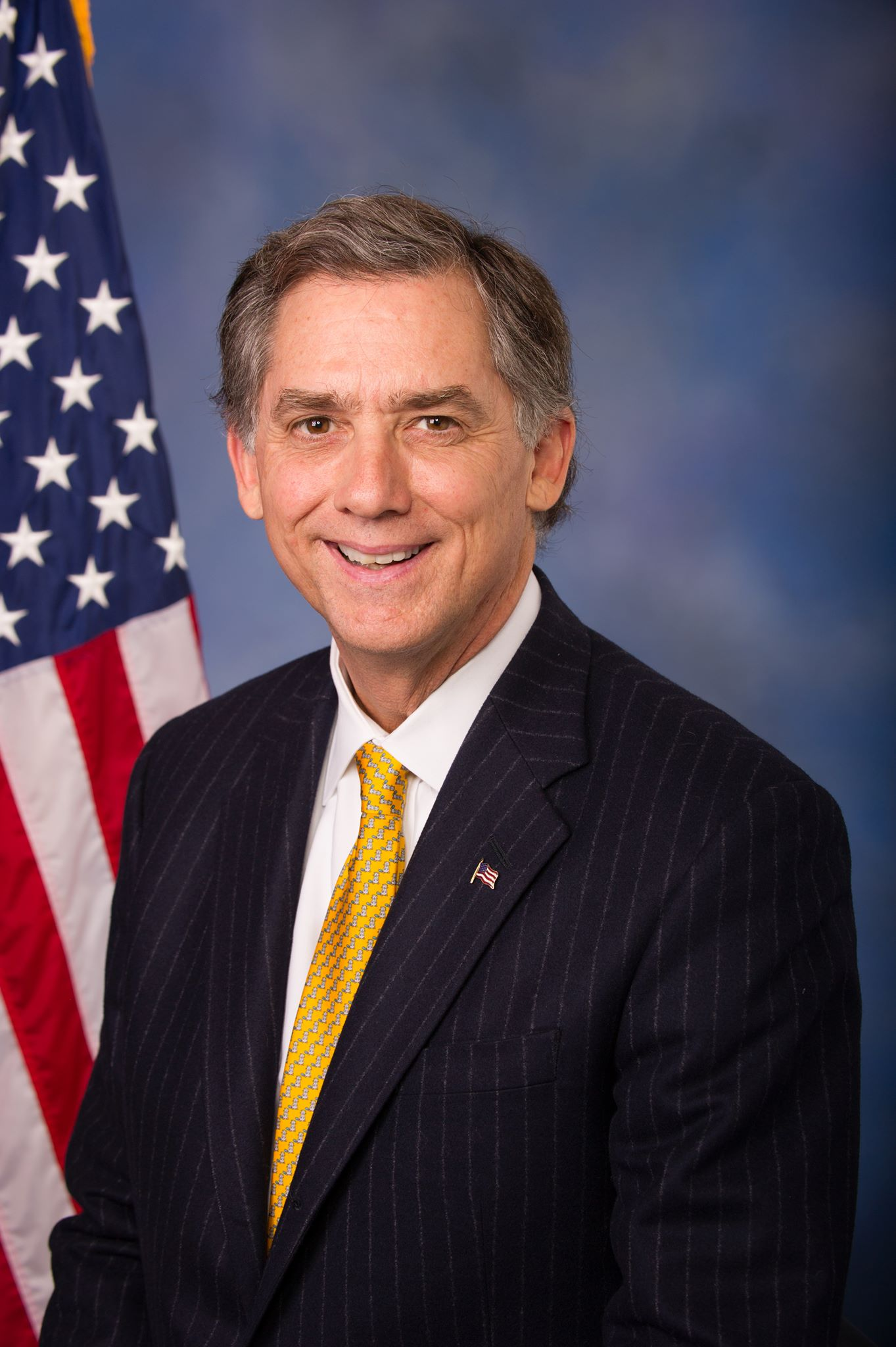
Hill during the 114th United States Congress (2015)

==== 2014 ====
Hill ran for the 2nd district U.S. House seat after fellow Republican Tim Griffin decided instead to run for lieutenant governor. Hill defeated Democratic nominee Pat Hays, the mayor of North Little Rock, 52 to 44 percent.

==== 2016 ====
Hill was renominated in the Republican primary over Brock Olree of Searcy (White County) and was reelected with 58% of the vote against the Democratic nominee, former Little Rock School District Board President Dianne Curry, and Libertarian nominee Chris Hayes of North Little Rock.

==== 2018 ====
In 2017, Arkansas' 2nd district was included on the initial list of Republican-held seats targeted by the Democratic Congressional Campaign Committee in 2018. In the November general election, Hill defeated Democratic nominee Clarke Tucker with 52.1% of the vote to Tucker's 45.8%. Libertarian Joe Swafford received 2%, electing him to a third term.

==== 2020 ====
Hill ran for another term. Sarah Huckabee Sanders endorsed Hill, speaking at a rally in support of him.

In 2020, the Hill campaign warned that Democratic nominee Joyce Elliott was "as dangerous as they come". Hill warned that if elected, Elliott would "be a member of the Democratic conference and she'd be a member of the Congressional Black Caucus and her first vote would be for Speaker Pelosi to be the speaker of the House." In the November general election, Hill defeated Elliott.

==== 2022 ====
In 2022 the 2nd district was redrawn to become more safely Republican after the census.

Hill ran for re-election, facing a Republican primary challenge from Conrad Reynolds, who positioned himself to Hill's right. Hill won renomination with 58.5% of the vote.

In the general election Hill was re-elected to a fifth term, defeating Democratic opponent Quintessa Hathaway with 60% of the vote.

==== 2024 ====
Hill ran for a sixth term in 2024. He was unopposed in the primary election and defeated his Democratic opponent Marcus Jones in the general with 58.9% of the vote to Jones's 41.1%.

==== 2026 ====
Hill sought a seventh term in 2026 running against nuclear engineer and 2022 democratic nominee for governor Chris Jones. With the entire state shifting left amidst a national large blue wave, Hill narrowly won reelection defeating Jones by roughly 1.7 percentage points in the general election. This was Hill's closest election in his entire political career.

=== Tenure ===
Hill is regarded as a moderate Republican.

Hill has been a member of the U.S. House during the presidencies of Barack Obama, Donald Trump (first term), Joe Biden, and Donald Trump (second term). During Trump's presidency, Hill voted in line with the president's position 96.8% of the time. At the start of Biden's presidency, Hill opposed Biden's decision to cancel the Keystone Pipeline. He said he wanted to work with the Biden administration on policy issues including Iran, free trade, and immigration. As of October 2021, Hill had voted in line with Biden's stated position 12.5% of the time.

On May 4, 2017, Hill voted to repeal the Patient Protection and Affordable Care Act (Obamacare) and pass the American Health Care Act. He voted for the Tax Cuts and Jobs Act of 2017.

On April 17, 2020, House Minority Leader Kevin McCarthy appointed Hill to the COVID-19 Congressional Oversight Commission to oversee the implementation of the CARES Act.

Hill praised the Trump administration's handling of the COVID-19 pandemic.

Hill did not join the majority of Republican members of Congress who signed an amicus brief in support of Texas v. Pennsylvania, a lawsuit filed at the United States Supreme Court contesting the results of the 2020 presidential election. Hill voted to certify both Arizona's and Pennsylvania's results in the 2021 United States Electoral College vote count.

In March 2021, Hill voted against the American Rescue Plan Act of 2021.

In 2020 and 2021, Hill strongly opposed plans by the United States and other nations in the G7 to issue a $650 billion Special Drawing Rights general allocation, calling for a specific and targeted allocation instead.

Hill strongly supported Biden's airstrikes on Iranian targets in Syria.

On May 19, 2021, Hill was one of 35 Republicans who joined all Democrats in voting to approve legislation to establish the January 6, 2021 commission meant to investigate the storming of the U.S. Capitol.

In 2025, Hill sponsored legislation to rescind a Consumer Financial Protection Bureau rule that set a cap for bank overdraft fees at $5.

In 2026, Hill supported the repeal of the Corporate Transparency Act’s requirements to disclose owners of shell companies.

=== Committee assignments ===
For the 118th Congress:

- Committee on Financial Services
  - Subcommittee on Capital Markets
  - Subcommittee on Digital Assets, Financial Technology and Inclusion (Chair)
- Committee on Foreign Affairs
  - Subcommittee on Global Health, Global Human Rights, and International Organizations
  - Subcommittee on Oversight and Accountability
- Permanent Select Committee on Intelligence
  - Subcommittee on National Intelligence Enterprise

=== Caucus memberships ===
- Main Street Caucus
- Republican Study Committee
- Congressional Arts Caucus
- Congressional Ukraine Caucus
- United States Congressional International Conservation Caucus
- U.S.-Japan Caucus
- Congressional Caucus on Turkey and Turkish Americans
- Congressional Coalition on Adoption
- United States–China Working Group

== Political positions ==
=== Abortion ===
Hill describes himself as pro-life. He voted in support of the Pain-Capable Unborn Child Protection Act. He has a 100% rating from the National Right to Life Committee for his pro-life voting record. He supported the 2022 overturning of Roe v. Wade, saying that it "elevates life by affirming that there is no constitutional right to an abortion."

== Electoral history ==
Arkansas' 2nd congressional district Republican primary election, 2014
Party	Candidate	Votes	%
Republican	French Hill	29,916	55.08
Republican	Ann Clemmer	12,400	22.83
Republican	Conrad Reynolds	11,994	22.08

Arkansas' 2nd congressional district election, 2014
Party	Candidate	Votes	%
Republican	French Hill	123,073	51.86
Democratic	Pat Hays	103,477	43.60
Libertarian	Debbie Standiford	10,590	4.46
Write-ins	Write-ins	190	0.08

Arkansas' 2nd congressional district Republican primary election, 2016
Party	Candidate	Votes	%
Republican	French Hill (inc.)	86,474	84.54
Republican	Brock Olree	15,811	15.46

Arkansas' 2nd congressional district election, 2016
Party	Candidate	Votes	%
Republican	French Hill (inc.)	176,472	58.34
Democratic	Dianne Curry	111,347	36.81
Libertarian	Chris Hayes	14,342	4.74
Write-ins	Write-ins	303	0.1

Arkansas' 2nd congressional district election, 2018
Party	Candidate	Votes	%
Republican	French Hill (inc.)	132,125	52.1
Democratic	Clarke Tucker	116,135	45.8
Libertarian	Joe Swafford	5,193	2.0

Arkansas' 2nd congressional district election, 2020
Party	Candidate	Votes	%
Republican	French Hill (inc.)	184,093	55.4
Democratic	Joyce Elliott	148,410	44.6

Arkansas' 2nd congressional district election, 2022
Party	Candidate	Votes	%
Republican	French Hill (inc.)	147,975	60.0
Democratic	Quintessa Hathaway	86,887	35.2
Libertarian	Michael White	11,584	4.7

Arkansas' 2nd congressional district election, 2024
Party	Candidate	Votes	%
Republican	French Hill (inc.)	180,508	58.9
Democratic	Marcus Jones	125,777	41.1

== Personal life ==
Hill and his wife, Martha McKenzie, have two children. He is a Catholic and a ninth-generation Arkansas Creole. Hill resides in Little Rock.

In 2023, Hill’s public financial disclosures show net worth between $10.3 million and $25.7 million.

U.S. House of Representatives
Preceded by Tim Griffin	Member of the U.S. House of Representatives from Arkansas's 2nd congressional district 2015–present	Incumbent
Preceded by Patrick McHenry	Chair of the House Financial Services Committee; 2025–present	Incumbent
U.S. order of precedence (ceremonial)
Preceded by Glenn Grothman	United States representatives by seniority 136th	Succeeded by Ted Lieu
