= 2018 United States House of Representatives elections in Arkansas =

- November 6, 2018

All 4 Arkansas seats to the United States House of Representatives
	Majority party	Minority party
Party	Republican	Democratic
Last election	4	0
Seats won	4	0
Seat change	Steady	Steady
Popular vote	556,339	312,978
Percentage	62.56%	35.19%
Swing	▼8.60%	▲24.77%

Republican
40–50%
50–60%
60–70%
70–80%
80–90%
Democratic
50–60%

The 2018 United States House of Representatives elections in Arkansas were held on Tuesday, November 6, 2018, to elect the four U.S. representatives from the U.S. state of Arkansas, one from each of the state's four congressional districts. Primaries were held on May 22, 2018. The elections and primaries coincided with the elections and primaries of other federal and state offices. Polls were open from 7:30 AM to 7:30 PM CST. This election marked the first time in eight years where the Democrats contested every seat.

== Overview ==
=== District ===
District	Republican		Democratic		Others		Total		Result
District	Votes	%	Votes	%	Votes	%	Votes	%	Result
District 1	138,757	68.95%	57,907	28.77%	4,581	2.28%	201,245	100.00%	Republican hold
District 2	132,125	52.13%	116,135	45.82%	5,193	2.05%	253,453	100.00%	Republican hold
District 3	148,717	64.74%	74,952	32.63%	6,039	2.63%	229,708	100.00%	Republican hold
District 4	136,740	66.74%	63,984	31.23%	4,168	2.03%	204,892	100.00%	Republican hold
Total	556,339	62.56%	312,978	35.19%	19,981	2.25%	889,298	100.00%	

Popular vote
Republican	62.56%
Democratic	35.19%
Other	2.25%

House seats
Republican	100.00%

=== County ===
County	Republican		Democratic		Others		Margin		Total
County	#	%	#	%	#	%	#	%	Total
Arkansas	3,428	69.67%	1,406	28.58%	86	1.75%	2,022	41.10%	4,920
Ashley	4,143	67.63%	1,888	30.82%	95	1.55%	2,255	36.81%	6,126
Baxter	10,712	75.15%	3,189	22.37%	354	2.48%	7,523	52.77%	14,255
Benton	51,473	66.42%	23,805	30.72%	2,214	2.86%	27,668	35.70%	77,492
Boone	9,132	78.68%	2,239	19.29%	236	2.03%	6,893	59.39%	11,607
Bradley	1,832	64.53%	937	33.00%	70	2.47%	895	31.53%	2,839
Calhoun	1,268	71.28%	483	27.15%	28	1.57%	785	44.13%	1,779
Carroll	5,663	63.25%	3,094	34.56%	196	2.19%	2,569	28.69%	8,953
Chicot	1,537	43.58%	1,929	54.69%	61	1.73%	-392	-11.11%	3,527
Clark	3,767	55.98%	2,848	42.32%	114	1.69%	919	13.66%	6,729
Clay	3,182	77.35%	842	20.47%	90	2.19%	2,340	56.88%	4,114
Cleburne	7,928	82.45%	1,503	15.63%	185	1.92%	6,425	66.82%	9,616
Cleveland	2,015	77.80%	535	20.66%	40	1.54%	1,480	57.14%	2,590
Columbia	4,091	64.60%	2,172	34.30%	70	1.11%	1,919	30.30%	6,333
Conway	3,910	60.49%	2,443	37.79%	111	1.72%	1,467	22.69%	6,464
Craighead	17,389	66.77%	8,087	31.05%	566	2.17%	9,302	35.72%	26,042
Crawford	13,089	77.80%	3,300	19.62%	434	2.58%	9,789	58.19%	16,823
Crittenden	5,601	47.22%	6,085	51.30%	176	1.48%	-484	-4.08%	11,862
Cross	4,235	73.27%	1,441	24.93%	104	1.80%	2,794	48.34%	5,780
Dallas	1,279	60.56%	807	38.21%	26	1.23%	472	22.35%	2,112
Desha	1,658	48.85%	1,653	48.70%	83	2.45%	5	0.15%	3,394
Drew	3,432	64.13%	1,819	33.99%	101	1.89%	1,613	30.14%	5,352
Faulkner	23,702	61.50%	13,737	35.65%	1,099	2.85%	9,965	25.86%	38,538
Franklin	4,023	76.47%	1,119	21.27%	119	2.26%	2,904	55.20%	5,261
Fulton	2,790	73.46%	933	24.57%	75	1.97%	1,857	48.89%	3,798
Garland	21,187	66.69%	9,988	31.44%	594	1.87%	11,199	35.25%	31,769
Grant	4,463	80.44%	988	17.81%	97	1.75%	3,475	62.64%	5,548
Greene	8,470	77.61%	2,176	19.94%	268	2.46%	6,294	57.67%	10,914
Hempstead	3,194	64.62%	1,690	34.19%	59	1.19%	1,504	30.43%	4,943
Hot Spring	6,261	71.84%	2,274	26.09%	180	2.07%	3,987	45.75%	8,715
Howard	2,453	69.81%	1,008	28.69%	53	1.51%	1,445	41.12%	3,514
Independence	7,879	78.01%	1,980	19.60%	241	2.39%	5,899	58.41%	10,100
Izard	3,524	79.24%	838	18.84%	85	1.91%	2,686	60.40%	4,447
Jackson	3,014	72.30%	1,082	25.95%	73	1.75%	1,932	46.34%	4,169
Jefferson	7,837	40.06%	11,336	57.94%	392	2.00%	-3,499	-17.88%	19,565
Johnson	5,200	69.96%	1,996	26.85%	237	3.19%	3,204	43.11%	7,433
Lafayette	1,362	64.31%	716	33.81%	40	1.89%	646	30.50%	2,118
Lawrence	3,616	77.53%	922	19.77%	126	2.70%	2,694	57.76%	4,664
Lee	924	43.98%	1,154	54.93%	23	1.09%	-230	-10.95%	2,101
Lincoln	1,971	65.22%	875	28.95%	176	5.82%	1,096	36.27%	3,022
Little River	2,751	70.21%	1,097	28.00%	70	1.79%	1,654	42.22%	3,918
Logan	4,112	74.59%	1,156	20.97%	245	4.44%	2,956	53.62%	5,513
Lonoke	15,728	76.74%	4,259	20.78%	507	2.47%	11,469	55.96%	20,494
Madison	3,948	71.63%	1,426	25.87%	138	2.50%	2,522	45.75%	5,512
Marion	3,954	76.64%	1,085	21.03%	120	2.33%	2,869	55.61%	5,159
Miller	8,189	71.75%	3,087	27.05%	137	1.20%	5,102	44.70%	11,413
Mississippi	6,460	62.27%	3,659	35.27%	256	2.47%	2,801	27.00%	10,375
Monroe	1,408	54.40%	1,131	43.70%	49	1.89%	277	10.70%	2,588
Montgomery	2,162	76.40%	615	21.73%	53	1.87%	1,547	54.66%	2,830
Nevada	1,562	62.08%	906	36.01%	48	1.91%	656	26.07%	2,516
Newton	2,316	73.64%	675	21.46%	154	4.90%	1,641	52.18%	3,145
Ouachita	3,934	53.55%	3,249	44.23%	163	2.22%	685	9.32%	7,346
Perry	2,568	69.35%	1,047	28.27%	88	2.38%	1,521	41.07%	3,703
Phillips	2,182	40.57%	3,125	58.10%	72	1.34%	-943	-17.53%	5,379
Pike	2,664	79.90%	599	17.97%	71	2.13%	2,065	61.94%	3,334
Poinsett	4,651	76.40%	1,273	20.91%	164	2.69%	3,378	55.49%	6,088
Polk	4,958	81.96%	972	16.07%	119	1.97%	3,986	65.90%	6,049
Pope	13,690	76.23%	3,876	21.58%	393	2.19%	9,814	54.65%	17,959
Prairie	2,144	75.84%	628	22.21%	55	1.95%	1,516	53.63%	2,827
Pulaski	52,467	38.89%	80,138	59.41%	2,289	1.70%	-27,671	-20.51%	134,894
Randolph	4,268	76.17%	1,149	20.51%	186	3.32%	3,119	55.67%	5,603
Saline	28,284	68.06%	12,321	29.65%	953	2.29%	15,963	38.41%	41,558
Scott	2,332	81.85%	442	15.51%	75	2.63%	1,890	66.34%	2,849
Searcy	2,546	81.32%	478	15.27%	107	3.42%	2,068	66.05%	3,131
Sebastian	23,112	69.76%	9,044	27.30%	973	2.94%	14,068	42.46%	33,129
Sevier	2,372	74.31%	734	22.99%	86	2.69%	1,638	51.32%	3,192
Sharp	4,407	78.14%	1,102	19.54%	131	2.32%	3,305	58.60%	5,640
St. Francis	2,587	44.96%	3,038	52.80%	129	2.24%	-451	-7.84%	5,754
Stone	3,346	75.92%	954	21.65%	107	2.43%	2,392	54.28%	4,407
Union	7,867	64.40%	4,164	34.09%	184	1.51%	3,703	30.32%	12,215
Van Buren	4,525	72.03%	1,603	25.52%	154	2.45%	2,922	46.51%	6,282
Washington	34,346	52.22%	29,775	45.27%	1,651	2.51%	4,571	6.95%	65,772
White	16,669	75.72%	4,846	22.01%	499	2.27%	11,823	53.71%	22,014
Woodruff	1,208	58.16%	829	39.91%	40	1.93%	379	18.25%	2,077
Yell	3,988	75.17%	1,179	22.22%	138	2.60%	2,809	52.95%	5,305
Totals	556,339	62.56%	312,978	35.19%	19,981	2.25%	243,361	27.37%	889,298

== District 1 ==
2018 Arkansas's 1st congressional district election
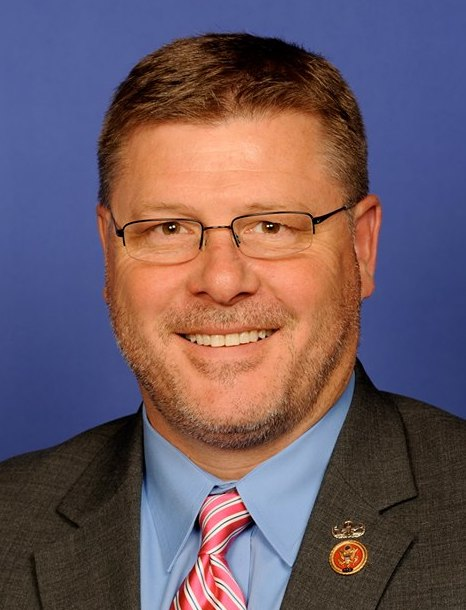

Nominee	Rick Crawford	Chintan Desai
Party	Republican	Democratic
Popular vote	138,757	57,907
Percentage	68.9%	28.8%
- County results Crawford: 40–50% 50–60% 60–70% 70–80% 80–90% Desai: 50–60% 60–70%
U.S. Representative before election
Rick Crawford
Republican
Elected U.S. Representative
Rick Crawford
Republican

Incumbent Republican Rick Crawford, who had represented the district since 2011, ran for re-election. He was re-elected with 76% of the vote in 206. The district had a PVI of R+16.

=== Republican primary ===
==== Candidates ====
===== Nominee =====
- Rick Crawford, incumbent U.S. representative

=== Democratic primary ===
==== Candidates ====
===== Nominee =====
- Chintan Desai, project manager for KIPP: Delta Public Schools and former Teach for America member

===== Withdrawn =====
- Robert Butler

=== Libertarian primary ===
==== Candidates ====
===== Nominee =====
- Elvis D. Presley, Elvis impersonator, auto-mechanic, nominee for Arkansas Commissioner of State Lands in 2014 and for State Senate in 2016

=== General election ===
==== Predictions ====
Source	Ranking	As of
The Cook Political Report	Safe R	November 5, 2018
Inside Elections	Safe R	November 5, 2018
Sabato's Crystal Ball	Safe R	November 5, 2018
RCP	Safe R	November 5, 2018
Daily Kos	Safe R	November 5, 2018
538	Safe R	November 7, 2018
CNN	Safe R	October 31, 2018
Politico	Safe R	November 2, 2018

==== Polling ====
Poll source	Dates administered	Sample size	Margin of error	Rick Crawford (R)	Chintan Desai (D)	Elvis Presley (L)	Undecided
Hendrix College	September 5–7, 2018	422	± 4.7%	57%	22%	3%	18%

==== Results ====
2018 Arkansas's 1st congressional district election
Party	Candidate	Votes	%
Republican	Rick Crawford (incumbent)	138,757	68.9
Democratic	Chintan Desai	57,907	28.8
Libertarian	Elvis Presley	4,581	2.3
Total votes		201,245	100.0
Republican hold			

==== By county ====
County	Rick Crawford Republican		Chintan Desai Democratic		Elvis Presley Libertarian		Margin		Total
County	#	%	#	%	#	%	#	%	Total
Arkansas	3,428	69.67%	1,406	28.58%	86	1.75%	2,022	41.10%	4,920
Baxter	10,712	75.15%	3,189	22.37%	354	2.48%	7,523	52.77%	14,255
Chicot	1,537	43.58%	1,929	54.69%	61	1.73%	-392	-11.11%	3,527
Clay	3,182	77.35%	842	20.47%	90	2.19%	2,340	56.88%	4,114
Cleburne	7,928	82.45%	1,503	15.63%	185	1.92%	6,425	66.82%	9,616
Craighead	17,389	66.77%	8,087	31.05%	566	2.17%	9,302	35.72%	26,042
Crittenden	5,601	47.22%	6,085	51.30%	176	1.48%	-484	-4.08%	11,862
Cross	4,235	73.27%	1,441	24.93%	104	1.80%	2,794	48.34%	5,780
Desha	1,658	48.85%	1,653	48.70%	83	2.45%	5	0.15%	3,394
Fulton	2,790	73.46%	933	24.57%	75	1.97%	1,857	48.89%	3,798
Greene	8,470	77.61%	2,176	19.94%	268	2.46%	6,294	57.67%	10,914
Independence	7,879	78.01%	1,980	19.60%	241	2.39%	5,899	58.41%	10,100
Izard	3,524	79.24%	838	18.84%	85	1.91%	2,686	60.40%	4,447
Jackson	3,014	72.30%	1,082	25.95%	73	1.75%	1,932	46.34%	4,169
Jefferson (part)	113	34.24%	207	62.73%	10	3.03%	-94	-28.48%	330
Lawrence	3,616	77.53%	922	19.77%	126	2.70%	2,694	57.76%	4,664
Lee	924	43.98%	1,154	54.93%	23	1.09%	-230	-10.95%	2,101
Lincoln	1,971	65.22%	875	28.95%	176	5.82%	1,096	36.27%	3,022
Lonoke	15,728	76.74%	4,259	20.78%	507	2.47%	11,469	55.96%	20,494
Mississippi	6,460	62.27%	3,659	35.27%	256	2.47%	2,801	27.00%	10,375
Monroe	1,408	54.40%	1,131	43.70%	49	1.89%	277	10.70%	2,588
Phillips	2,182	40.57%	3,125	58.10%	72	1.34%	-943	-17.53%	5,379
Poinsett	4,651	76.40%	1,273	20.91%	164	2.69%	3,378	55.49%	6,088
Prairie	2,144	75.84%	628	22.21%	55	1.95%	1,516	53.63%	2,827
Randolph	4,268	76.17%	1,149	20.51%	186	3.32%	3,119	55.67%	5,603
Searcy (part)	2,397	81.03%	458	15.48%	103	3.48%	1,939	65.55%	2,958
Sharp	4,407	78.14%	1,102	19.54%	131	2.32%	3,305	58.60%	5,640
St. Francis	2,587	44.96%	3,038	52.80%	129	2.24%	-451	-7.84%	5,754
Stone	3,346	75.92%	954	21.65%	107	2.43%	2,392	54.28%	4,407
Woodruff	1,208	58.16%	829	39.91%	40	1.93%	379	18.25%	2,077
Totals	138,757	68.95%	57,907	28.77%	4,581	2.28%	80,850	40.17%	201,245

== District 2 ==
2018 Arkansas's 2nd congressional district election
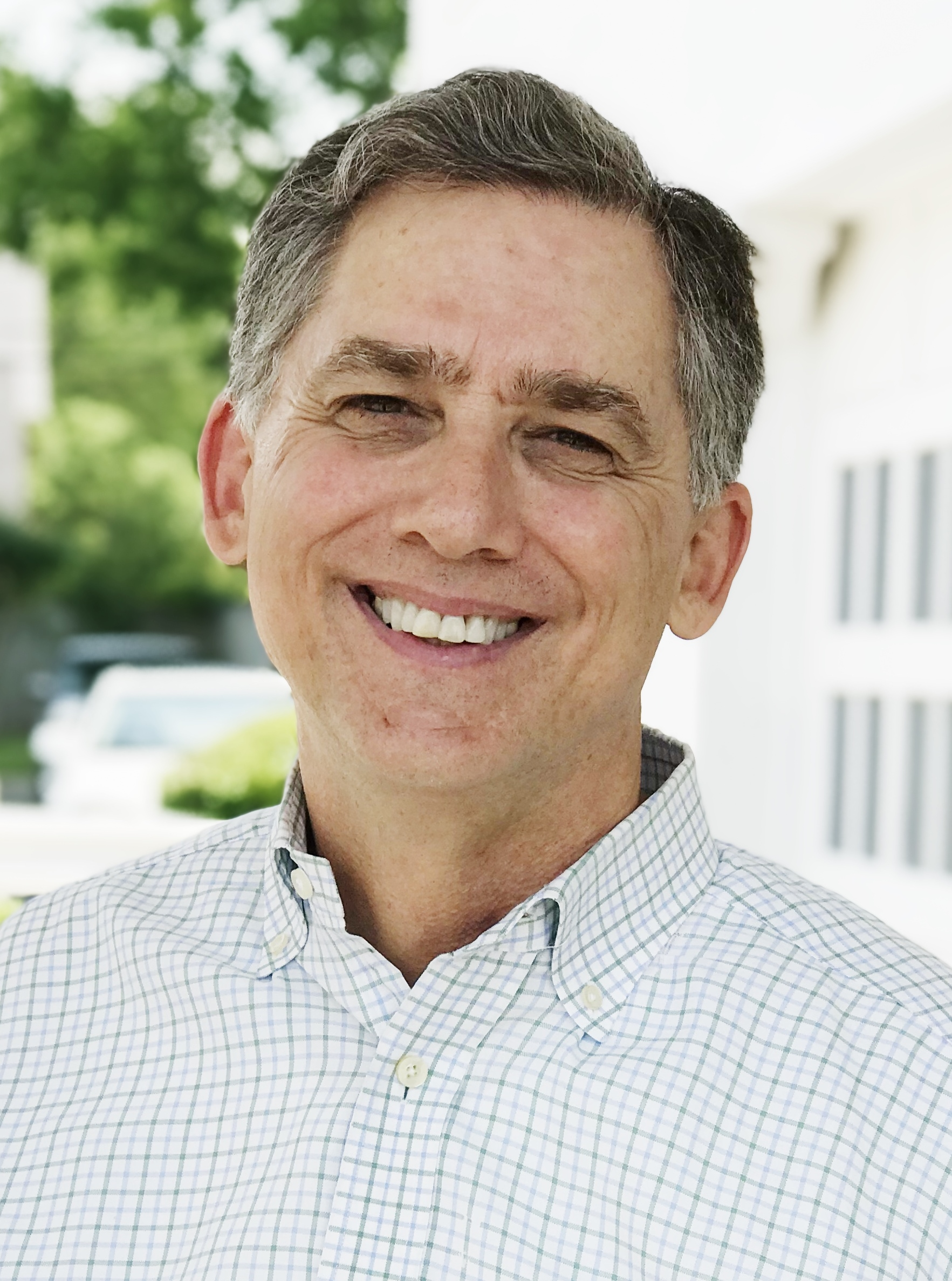

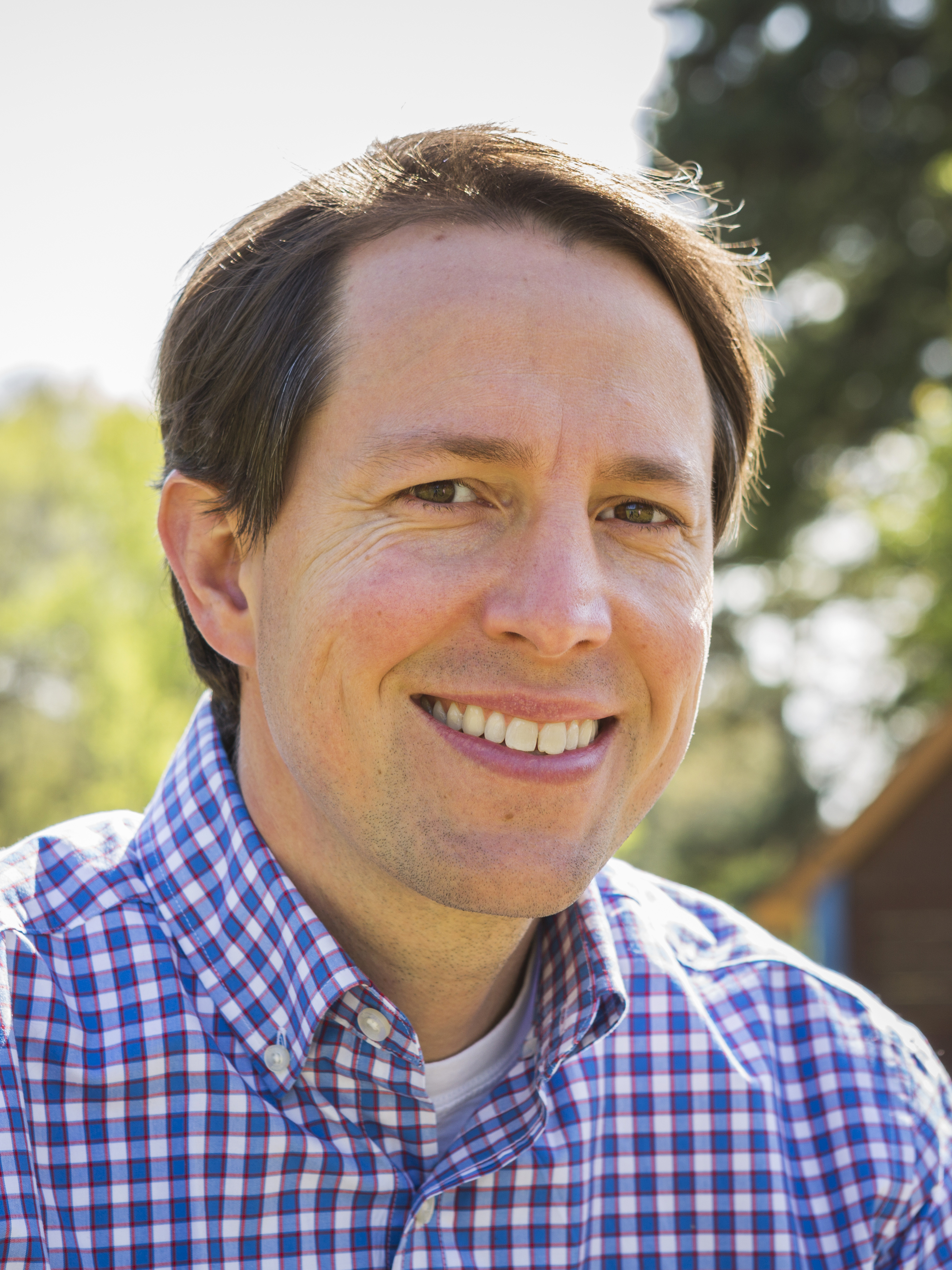
Nominee	French Hill	Clarke Tucker
Party	Republican	Democratic
Popular vote	132,125	116,135
Percentage	52.1%	45.8%
- County results Hill: 60–70% 70–80% Tucker: 50–60%
U.S. Representative before election
French Hill
Republican
Elected U.S. Representative
French Hill
Republican

Incumbent Republican French Hill, who had represented the district since 2015, ran for re-election. He was re-elected with 58% of the vote in 2016. The district had a PVI of R+7.

=== Republican primary ===
==== Candidates ====
===== Nominee =====
- French Hill, incumbent U.S. representative

=== Democratic primary ===
The 2nd district was included on the initial list of Republican-held seats being targeted by the Democratic Congressional Campaign Committee in 2018.

==== Candidates ====
===== Nominee =====
- Clarke Tucker, state representative

===== Eliminated in primary =====
- Gwendolynn Millen Combs, teacher and businesswoman
- Jonathan Dunkley
- Paul Spencer, teacher and activist

===== Declined =====
- Win Thompson, former University of Central Arkansas president

==== Primary results ====
Results by county Tucker: 50–60%; 60–70%

Democratic primary results
Party	Candidate	Votes	%
Democratic	Clarke Tucker	23,325	57.8
Democratic	Gwen Combs	8,188	20.3
Democratic	Paul Spencer	5,063	12.6
Democratic	Johnathan Dunkley	3,768	9.3
Total votes		40,344	100.0

=== Libertarian primary ===
==== Candidates ====
===== Nominee =====
- Joe Swafford, residential appraiser

=== General election ===
==== Endorsements ====
Clarke Tucker (D)

Organizations

- Democratic Congressional Campaign Committee "Red to Blue" Program

==== Debates ====
- Complete video of debate, October 8, 2018

==== Polling ====
Poll source	Date(s) administered	Sample size	Margin of error	French Hill (R)	Clarke Tucker (D)	Joe Swafford (L)	Undecided
Hendrix College	October 17–18, 2018	590	± 4.0%	51%	40%	2%	7%
Hendrix College	September 5–7, 2018	428	± 4.7%	50%	40%	2%	8%
Public Policy Polling (D)	April 16–17, 2018	610	± 4.0%	47%	42%	—	11%

==== Predictions ====
Source	Ranking	As of
The Cook Political Report	Likely R	November 5, 2018
Inside Elections	Likely R	November 5, 2018
Sabato's Crystal Ball	Lean R	November 5, 2018
RCP	Likely R	November 5, 2018
Daily Kos	Likely R	November 5, 2018
538	Likely R	November 7, 2018
CNN	Lean R	October 31, 2018
Politico	Lean R	November 2, 2018

==== Results ====
2018 Arkansas's 2nd congressional district election
Party	Candidate	Votes	%
Republican	French Hill (incumbent)	132,125	52.1
Democratic	Clarke Tucker	116,135	45.8
Libertarian	Joe Swafford	5,193	2.0
Total votes		253,453	100.0
Republican hold			

==== By county ====
County	French Hill Republican		Clarke Tucker Democratic		Joe Swafford Libertarian		Margin		Total
County	#	%	#	%	#	%	#	%	Total
Conway	3,910	60.49%	2,443	37.79%	111	1.72%	1,467	22.69%	6,464
Faulkner	23,702	61.50%	13,737	35.65%	1,099	2.85%	9,965	25.86%	38,538
Perry	2,568	69.35%	1,047	28.27%	88	2.38%	1,521	41.07%	3,703
Pulaski	52,467	38.89%	80,138	59.41%	2,289	1.70%	-27,671	-20.51%	134,894
Saline	28,284	68.06%	12,321	29.65%	953	2.29%	15,963	38.41%	41,558
Van Buren	4,525	72.03%	1,603	25.52%	154	2.45%	2,922	46.51%	6,282
White	16,669	75.72%	4,846	22.01%	499	2.27%	11,823	53.71%	22,014
Totals	132,125	52.13%	116,135	45.82%	5,193	2.05%	15,990	6.31%	253,453

== District 3 ==
2018 Arkansas's 3rd congressional district election
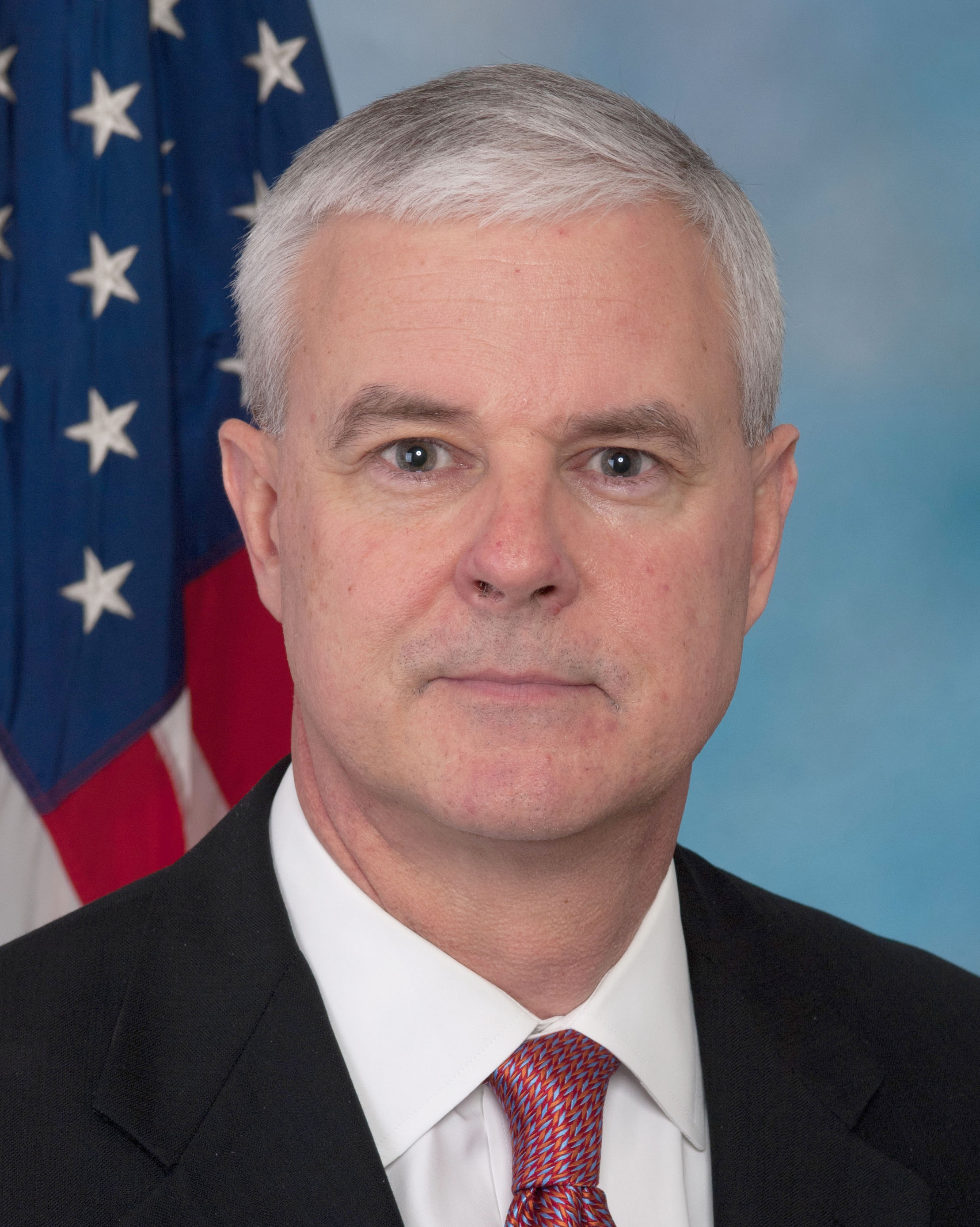

Nominee	Steve Womack	Joshua Mahony
Party	Republican	Democratic
Popular vote	148,717	74,952
Percentage	64.7%	32.6%
- County results Womack: 50–60% 60–70% 70–80% 80–90%
U.S. Representative before election
Steve Womack
Republican
Elected U.S. Representative
Steve Womack
Republican

Incumbent Republican Steve Womack, who had represented the district since 2011, ran for re-election. He was re-elected with 77% of the vote in 2016. The district had a PVI of R+19.

=== Republican primary ===
==== Candidates ====
===== Nominee =====
- Steve Womack, incumbent U.S. representative

===== Eliminated in primary =====
- Robb Ryerse, pastor

==== Primary results ====
Results by county Womack: 80–90%

Republican primary results
Party	Candidate	Votes	%
Republican	Steve Womack (incumbent)	47,757	84.2
Republican	Robb Ryerse	8,988	15.8
Total votes		56,745	100.0

=== Democratic primary ===
==== Candidates ====
===== Nominee =====
- Joshua Mahony, president of the Arkansas Single Parent Scholarship Fund and former chairman of the Fayetteville Airport Commission

=== Libertarian primary ===
==== Candidates ====
===== Nominee =====
- Michael Kalagias, retired teacher and volunteer firefighter

=== General election ===
==== Predictions ====
Source	Ranking	As of
The Cook Political Report	Safe R	November 5, 2018
Inside Elections	Safe R	November 5, 2018
Sabato's Crystal Ball	Safe R	November 5, 2018
RCP	Safe R	November 5, 2018
Daily Kos	Safe R	November 5, 2018
538	Safe R	November 7, 2018
CNN	Safe R	October 31, 2018
Politico	Safe R	November 2, 2018

==== Campaign ====
This was the first time since he was first elected in 2010 that Womack had faced a Democrat in the general election, having only had opposition from minor parties since.

==== Polling ====
Poll source	Dates administered	Sample size	Margin of error	Steve Womack (R)	Josh Mahony (D)	Michael Kalagias (L)	Undecided
Hendrix College	September 5–7, 2018	428	± 4.7%	53%	31%	5%	11%

==== Results ====
2018 Arkansas's 3rd congressional district election
Party	Candidate	Votes	%
Republican	Steve Womack (incumbent)	148,717	64.7
Democratic	Joshua Mahony	74,952	32.6
Libertarian	Michael Kalagias	5,899	2.6
Write-in		140	0.1
Total votes		229,708	100.0
Republican hold			

==== By county ====
County	Steve Womack Republican		Joshua Mahony Democratic		Various candidates Other parties		Margin		Total
County	#	%	#	%	#	%	#	%	Total
Benton	51,473	66.42%	23,805	30.72%	2,214	2.86%	27,668	35.70%	77,492
Boone	9,132	78.68%	2,239	19.29%	236	2.03%	6,893	59.39%	11,607
Carroll	5,663	63.25%	3,094	34.56%	196	2.19%	2,569	28.69%	8,953
Crawford (part)	9,371	77.80%	2,361	19.60%	313	2.60%	7,010	58.20%	12,045
Marion	3,954	76.64%	1,085	21.03%	120	2.33%	2,869	55.61%	5,159
Newton (part)	1,135	82.43%	222	16.12%	20	1.45%	913	66.30%	1,377
Pope	13,690	76.23%	3,876	21.58%	393	2.19%	9,814	54.65%	17,959
Searcy (part)	149	86.13%	20	11.56%	4	2.31%	129	74.57%	173
Sebastian (part)	19,804	67.89%	8,475	29.05%	892	3.06%	11,329	38.84%	29,171
Washington	34,346	52.22%	29,775	45.27%	1,651	2.51%	4,571	6.95%	65,772
Totals	148,717	64.74%	74,952	32.63%	6,039	2.63%	73,765	32.11%	229,708

== District 4 ==
2018 Arkansas's 4th congressional district election
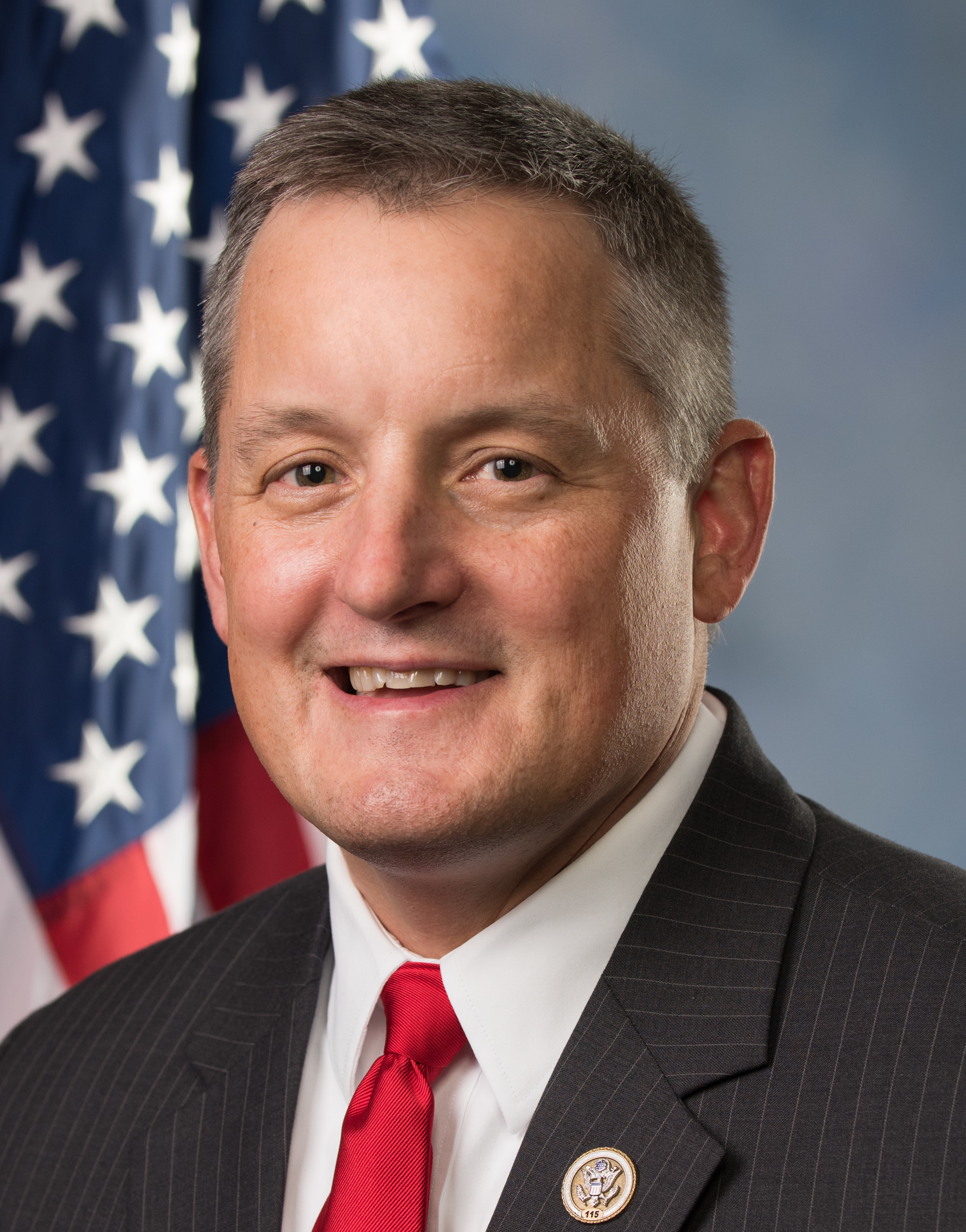

Nominee	Bruce Westerman	Hayden Shamel
Party	Republican	Democratic
Popular vote	136,740	63,984
Percentage	66.7%	31.2%
- County results Westerman: 50–60% 60–70% 70–80% 80–90% Shamel: 50–60%
U.S. Representative before election
Bruce Westerman
Republican
Elected U.S. Representative
Bruce Westerman
Republican

Incumbent Republican Bruce Westerman, who had represented the district since 2015, ran for re-election. He was re-elected with 75% of the vote in 2016. The district had a PVI of R+17.

=== Republican primary ===
==== Candidates ====
===== Nominee =====
- Bruce Westerman, incumbent U.S. representative

===== Eliminated in primary =====
- Randy Caldwell, preacher

==== Primary results ====
Results by county Westerman: 60–70%; 70–80%; 80–90%

Republican primary results
Party	Candidate	Votes	%
Republican	Bruce Westerman (incumbent)	40,201	79.8
Republican	Randy Caldwell	10,151	20.2
Total votes		50,352	100.0

=== Democratic primary ===
==== Candidates ====
===== Nominee =====
- Hayden Shamel, teacher

=== Libertarian primary ===
==== Candidates ====
===== Nominee =====
- Tom Canada, manufacturing lead

=== General election ===
==== Predictions ====
Source	Ranking	As of
The Cook Political Report	Safe R	November 5, 2018
Inside Elections	Safe R	November 5, 2018
Sabato's Crystal Ball	Safe R	November 5, 2018
RCP	Safe R	November 5, 2018
Daily Kos	Safe R	November 5, 2018
538	Safe R	November 7, 2018
CNN	Safe R	October 31, 2018
Politico	Safe R	November 2, 2018

==== Debate ====
2018 Arkansas's 4th congressional district debate
No.	Date	Host	Moderator	Link	Republican	Democratic	Libertarian
Key: P Participant A Absent N Not invited I Invited W Withdrawn							
Key: P Participant A Absent N Not invited I Invited W Withdrawn					Bruce Westerman	Hayden Shamel	Tom Canada
1	Oct. 8, 2018	AETN	Steve Barnes		P	P	A

==== Polling ====
Poll source	Dates administered	Sample size	Margin of error	Bruce Westerman (R)	Hayden Shamel (D)	Tom Canada (L)	Undecided
Hendrix College	September 5–7, 2018	423	± 4.7%	54%	24%	5%	17%

==== Results ====
2018 Arkansas's 4th congressional district election
Party	Candidate	Votes	%
Republican	Bruce Westerman (incumbent)	136,740	66.7
Democratic	Hayden Shamel	63,984	31.2
Libertarian	Tom Canada	3,952	1.9
Write-in		216	0.1
Total votes		204,892	100.0
Republican hold			

==== By county ====
County	Bruce Westerman Republican		Hayden Shamel Democratic		Various candidates Other parties		Margin		Total
County	#	%	#	%	#	%	#	%	Total
Ashley	4,143	67.63%	1,888	30.82%	95	1.55%	2,255	36.81%	6,126
Bradley	1,832	64.53%	937	33.00%	70	2.47%	895	31.53%	2,839
Calhoun	1,268	71.28%	483	27.15%	28	1.57%	785	44.13%	1,779
Clark	3,767	55.98%	2,848	42.32%	114	1.69%	919	13.66%	6,729
Cleveland	2,015	77.80%	535	20.66%	40	1.54%	1,480	57.14%	2,590
Columbia	4,091	64.60%	2,172	34.30%	70	1.11%	1,919	30.30%	6,333
Crawford (part)	3,718	77.81%	939	19.65%	121	2.53%	2,779	58.16%	4,778
Dallas	1,279	60.56%	807	38.21%	26	1.23%	472	22.35%	2,112
Drew	3,432	64.13%	1,819	33.99%	101	1.89%	1,613	30.14%	5,352
Franklin	4,023	76.47%	1,119	21.27%	119	2.26%	2,904	55.20%	5,261
Garland	21,187	66.69%	9,988	31.44%	594	1.87%	11,199	35.25%	31,769
Grant	4,463	80.44%	988	17.81%	97	1.75%	3,475	62.64%	5,548
Hempstead	3,194	64.62%	1,690	34.19%	59	1.19%	1,504	30.43%	4,943
Hot Spring	6,261	71.84%	2,274	26.09%	180	2.07%	3,987	45.75%	8,715
Howard	2,453	69.81%	1,008	28.69%	53	1.51%	1,445	41.12%	3,514
Jefferson (part)	7,724	40.16%	11,129	57.86%	382	1.99%	-3,405	-17.70%	19,235
Johnson	5,200	69.96%	1,996	26.85%	237	3.19%	3,204	43.11%	7,433
Lafayette	1,362	64.31%	716	33.81%	40	1.89%	646	30.50%	2,118
Little River	2,751	70.21%	1,097	28.00%	70	1.79%	1,654	42.22%	3,918
Logan	4,112	74.59%	1,156	20.97%	245	4.44%	2,956	53.62%	5,513
Madison	3,948	71.63%	1,426	25.87%	138	2.50%	2,522	45.75%	5,512
Miller	8,189	71.75%	3,087	27.05%	137	1.20%	5,102	44.70%	11,413
Montgomery	2,162	76.40%	615	21.73%	53	1.87%	1,547	54.66%	2,830
Nevada	1,562	62.08%	906	36.01%	48	1.91%	656	26.07%	2,516
Newton (part)	1,181	66.80%	453	25.62%	134	7.58%	728	41.18%	1,768
Ouachita	3,934	53.55%	3,249	44.23%	163	2.22%	685	9.32%	7,346
Pike	2,664	79.90%	599	17.97%	71	2.13%	2,065	61.94%	3,334
Polk	4,958	81.96%	972	16.07%	119	1.97%	3,986	65.90%	6,049
Scott	2,332	81.85%	442	15.51%	75	2.63%	1,890	66.34%	2,849
Sebastian (part)	3,308	83.58%	569	14.38%	81	2.05%	2,739	69.20%	3,958
Sevier	2,372	74.31%	734	22.99%	86	2.69%	1,638	51.32%	3,192
Union	7,867	64.40%	4,164	34.09%	184	1.51%	3,703	30.32%	12,215
Yell	3,988	75.17%	1,179	22.22%	138	2.60%	2,809	52.95%	5,305
Totals	136,740	66.74%	63,984	31.23%	4,168	2.03%	72,756	35.51%	204,892
