= Richard Carroll (politician) =

American boilermaker and politician

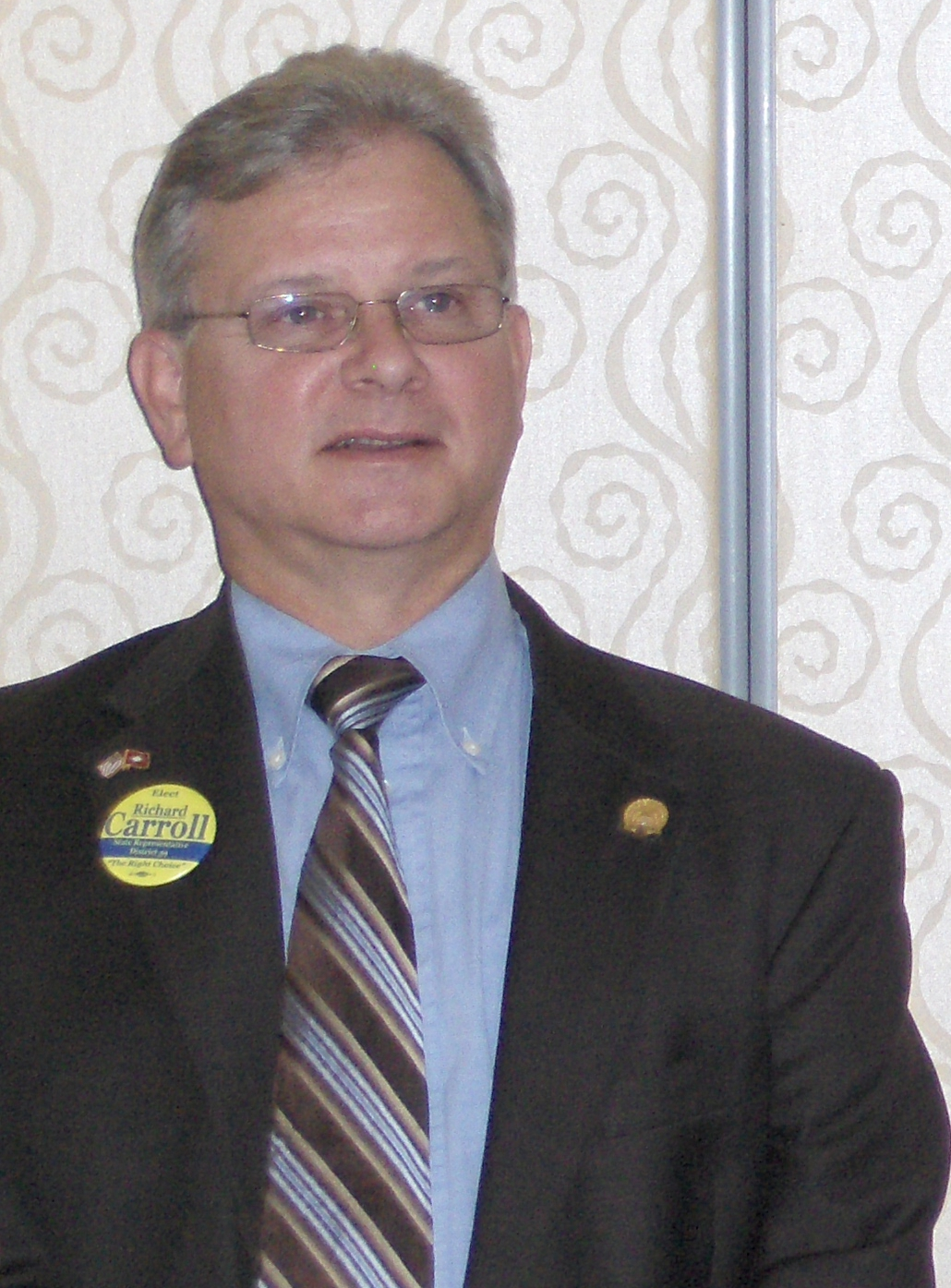
- Carroll in 2010

Member of the Arkansas House of Representatives from the 39th district
- In office January 12, 2009 – January 10, 2011
- Preceded by: Sharon Dobbins
- Succeeded by: Tracy Steele

Personal details
- Born: December 17, 1956 (age 69) Little Rock, Arkansas
- Party: Democratic (since 2010); Green (2008-2010)
- Profession: Boilermaker

Richard Carroll (born December 17, 1956, in Little Rock, Arkansas) is an American boilermaker and politician. He ran for District 39 of the Arkansas House of Representatives on the U.S. Green Party ticket on November 4, 2008, during the House elections to succeed Sharon Dobbins, and succeeded in the first Arkansas Green Party electoral victory on the state level. Carroll defeated a Democratic Party write-in candidate in the general election.

Upon taking office, Carroll became the highest-ranking current office holder of the Green Party of the United States, and the third in the party's history to be elected to a state-level political position. The first was Audie Bock, who won election to the California State Assembly in a Special Election on March 31, 1999, for the Green Party of California (but switched to independent a few months later and was defeated seeking re-election in 2000). The second was John Eder, who served as a member of the Maine House of Representatives for the Maine Green Independent Party from 2003 to 2007.

On April 29, 2009, Carroll announced that he would leave the Green Party and become a Democrat.

Previous to the 2008 election, Carroll worked as a boilermaker for 30 years, and has been a longtime member of the International Brotherhood of Boilermakers.

Carroll lost in the May 2010 Democratic primary for re-election to former State Senator Tracy Steele by a vote of 80.3% for Steele and 19.7% for Carroll.
