= Dee Bennett =

Psychologist and state legislator in Arkansas

Mildred Delores Bennett is a psychologist and former Arkansas state senator. She served in 1997 from Little Rock, Arkansas. She is African American.

She has worked as a counselor.
