= Corporate Transparency Act reporting requirements =

United States reporting régime

United States Congress
- Enacted by: United States Congress
- Administered by: Financial Crimes Enforcement Network

Corporate Transparency Act reporting requirements are U.S. federal rules requiring certain companies formed or registered to do business in the United States to disclose information about their beneficial owners to the Financial Crimes Enforcement Network (FinCEN). The reporting system was introduced as part of U.S. efforts to combat money laundering and the use of anonymous shell companies for illicit finance.

== Background ==
The reporting requirements implement provisions of the Corporate Transparency Act, a law enacted by the United States Congress in 2021 as part of broader anti-money-laundering reforms. The law requires many U.S. companies and foreign companies registered to operate in the United States to disclose identifying information about individuals who own or control them. Supporters of the legislation argued that anonymous shell companies had long been used to conceal the proceeds of corruption, tax evasion, and other financial crimes.

== Requirements ==
Beginning in 2024, many companies formed or registered in the United States were required to submit beneficial ownership information to FinCEN, including the names, dates of birth, addresses, and identifying documents of individuals who own or control at least 25 percent of the company or otherwise exercise substantial control. Companies created before 2024 were generally given a longer filing window, while newly formed companies were required to report information shortly after formation. Legal analysts noted that the rules potentially affected tens of millions of small and closely held businesses across the United States.

== Litigation ==
The reporting regime has been the subject of several legal challenges in federal courts. In 2024, a federal judge in Alabama ruled the Corporate Transparency Act unconstitutional in a case brought by a small business advocacy group, though the ruling initially applied only to the plaintiffs in the case. Subsequent litigation and appeals created uncertainty over whether the reporting requirements could be enforced nationwide, leading to multiple temporary injunctions and court rulings affecting implementation of the law.

== Changes to enforcement ==
In 2025, the US Department of the Treasury (USDT) announced changes to how the law would be enforced while regulatory revisions were considered. FinCEN later issued an interim rule adjusting compliance requirements and reporting deadlines while litigation and regulatory revisions continued.

The USDT officially repealed its implementation of the act in August 2026. The move effectively re-legalized anonymous shell corporations.

== See also ==
- Corporate Transparency Act
- Financial Crimes Enforcement Network
- Beneficial ownership
