= 2010 United States House of Representatives elections in Arkansas =

- November 2, 2010

All 4 Arkansas seats to the United States House of Representatives
	Majority party	Minority party
Party	Republican	Democratic
Last election	1	3
Seats won	3	1
Seat change	▲2	▼2
Popular vote	435,422	317,975
Percentage	56.25%	41.08%
Swing	▲28.91%	▼11.70%

Republican
40–50%
50–60%
60–70%
70–80%
80–90%
Democratic
40–50%
50–60%
60–70%
70–80%
80–90%

The 2010 congressional elections in Arkansas were held on November 2, 2010, to determine who would represent Arkansas in the United States House of Representatives. Arkansas has four seats in the House, apportioned according to the 2000 United States census. Representatives are elected for two-year terms; those elected served in the 112th Congress from January 3, 2011, until January 3, 2013. None of Arkansas's four representatives faced major party opposition in 2008. As of 2024, this was the last election in which a Democrat won a congressional district in Arkansas or managed 40% or more of the House popular vote in the state.

== Overview ==
The table below shows the total number and percentage of votes, as well as the number of seats gained and lost by each political party in the election for the United States House of Representatives in Arkansas.

United States House of Representatives elections in Arkansas, 2010
Party	Votes	Percentage	Seats	+/–
Republican	435,422	56.2%	3	+2
Democratic	317,975	41.1%	1	-2
Green	16,048	2.1%	0	-
Others	4,680	0.6%	0	-
Totals	774,125	100%	4	—

=== By district ===
Results of the 2010 United States House of Representatives elections in Arkansas by district:

District	Republican		Democratic		Others		Total		Result
District	Votes	%	Votes	%	Votes	%	Votes	%	Result
District 1	93,224	51.78%	78,267	43.48%	8,525	4.74%	180,016	100%	Republican Gain
District 2	122,091	57.90%	80,687	38.27%	8,074	3.83%	210,852	100%	Republican Gain
District 3	148,581	72.44%	56,542	27.56%	0	0.00%	205,123	100%	Republican Hold
District 4	71,526	40.15%	102,479	57.53%	4,129	2.32%	178,134	100%	Democratic Hold
Total	435,422	56.24%	317,975	41.08%	20,728	2.68%	774,125	100%	

== District 1 ==
2010 Arkansas's 1st congressional district election
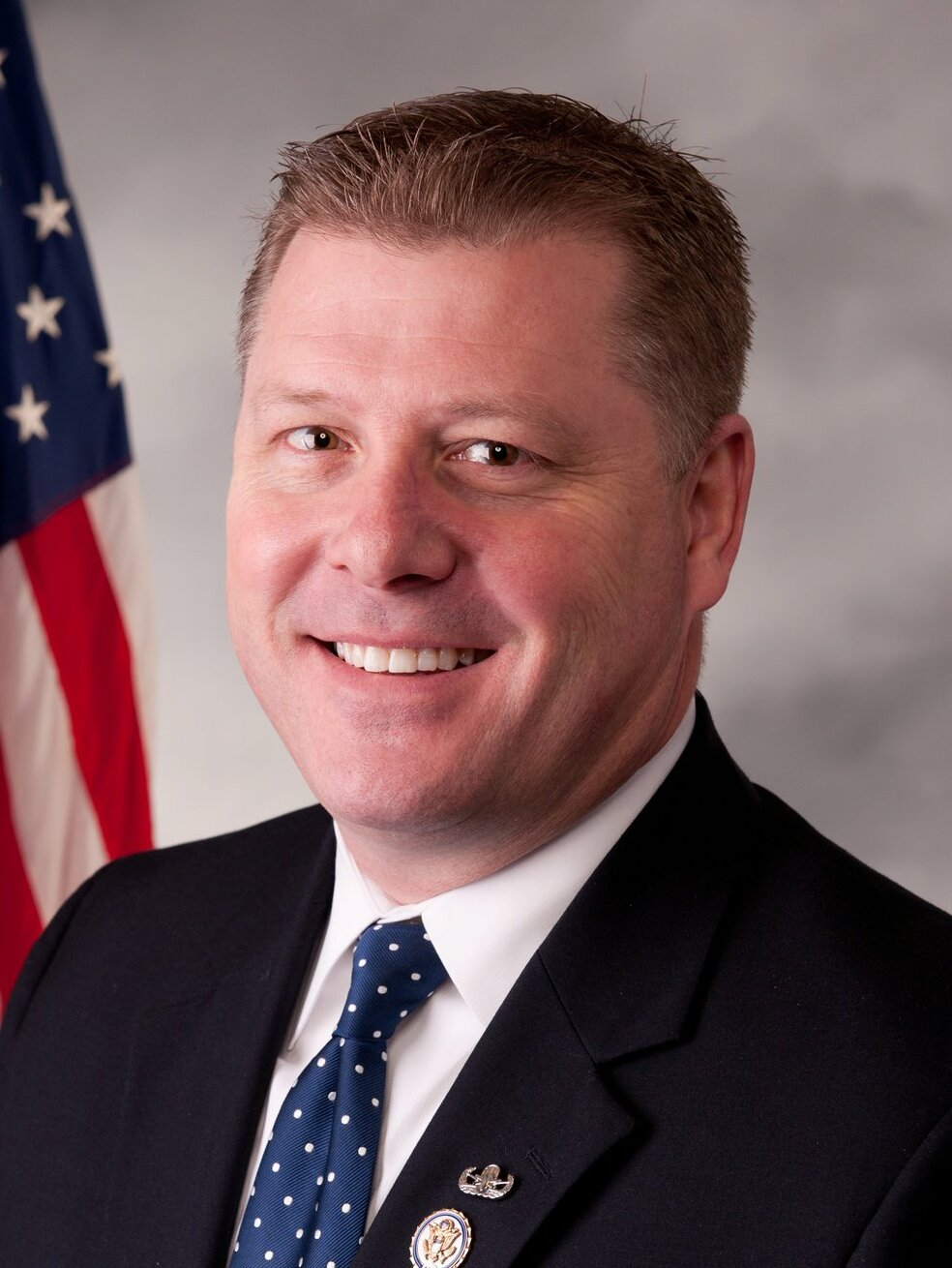

Nominee	Rick Crawford	Chad Causey
Party	Republican	Democratic
Popular vote	93,224	78,267
Percentage	51.8%	43.5%
- County results Crawford: 40–50% 50–60% 60–70% Causey: 40–50% 50–60% 60–70%
U.S. Representative before election
Marion Berry
Democratic
Elected U.S. Representative
Rick Crawford
Republican

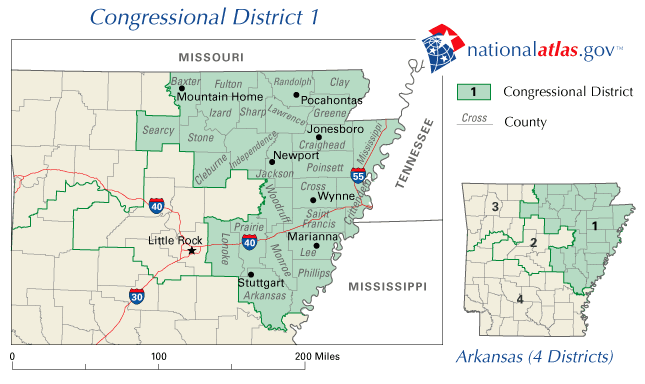
Arkansas's 1st district

This was an open seat, as Democratic incumbent Marion Berry retired.

Berry had always been reelected in this district by a wide margin since his first reelection campaign in 1998, and was unopposed in 2008. The district was very Republican (giving only 38% to Obama) on a national level despite a long history of electing Democrats to local and state level offices.

- AR - District 1 from OurCampaigns.com
- Campaign Contributions from OpenSecrets
- 2010 Arkansas- 1st District from CQ Politics
- Race profile at The New York Times

=== Democrat ===
- Chad Causey, attorney and chief of staff for Marion Berry

=== Republican ===
- Rick Crawford, businessman

=== Green ===
- Kenton Adler (campaign site, PVS)

=== Polling ===
Poll Source	Dates Administered	Rick Crawford (R)	Chad Causey (D)	Ken Adler (G)	Undecided
Anzalone Liszt Research	September 13–16, 2010	44%	46%	-	-
Talk Business Poll	August 17, 2010	48%	32%	4%	16%

==== Predictions ====
Source	Ranking	As of
The Cook Political Report	Lean R (flip)	November 1, 2010
Rothenberg	Tilt R (flip)	November 1, 2010
Sabato's Crystal Ball	Lean R (flip)	November 1, 2010
RCP	Lean R (flip)	November 1, 2010
CQ Politics	Tossup	October 28, 2010
New York Times	Lean R (flip)	November 1, 2010
FiveThirtyEight	Likely R (flip)	November 1, 2010

=== Results ===
U.S. Congress District 01 election
Party	Candidate	Votes	%
Republican	Rick Crawford	93,224	51.79
Democratic	Chad Causey	78,267	43.48
Green	Ken Adler	8,320	4.62
Write-ins		205	0.11
Total votes		180,016	100
Republican gain from Democratic			

== District 2 ==
2010 Arkansas's 2nd congressional district election
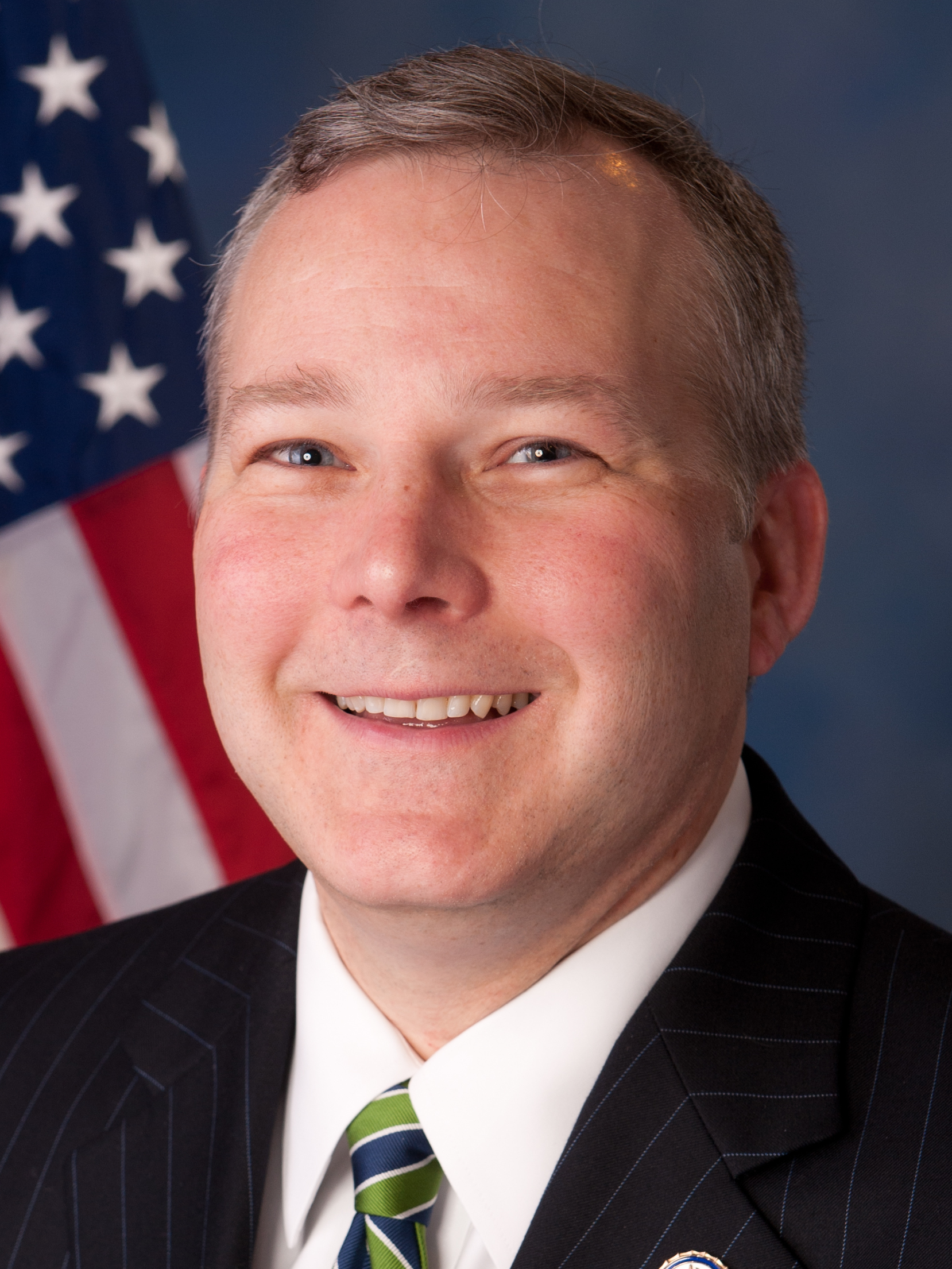

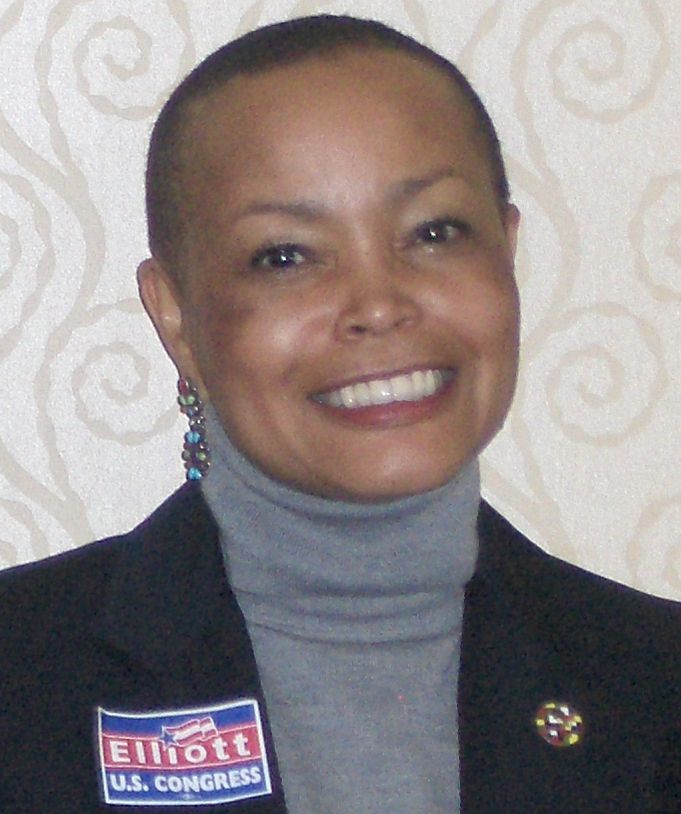
Nominee	Tim Griffin	Joyce Elliott
Party	Republican	Democratic
Popular vote	122,091	80,687
Percentage	57.9%	38.3%
- County results Griffin: 50–60% 60–70% 70–80% Elliott: 40–50%
U.S. Representative before election
Vic Snyder
Democratic
Elected U.S. Representative
Tim Griffin
Republican

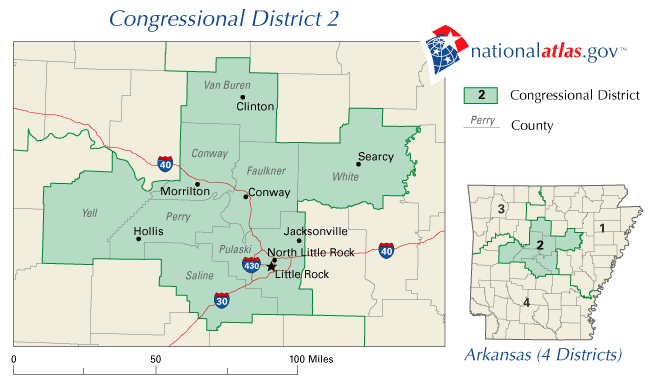
Arkansas's 2nd district

This district was represented by seven term Democrat Vic Snyder who was unchallenged in 2008 and received 70% of the vote. Snyder announced that he would retire in 2010, reportedly after polls showed him trailing Republican Tim Griffin.

- AR - District 2 from OurCampaigns.com
- Campaign Contributions from OpenSecrets
- 2010 Alabama - 2nd District from CQ Politics
- Race profile at The New York Times

=== Democrat ===
- Joyce Elliott, State Senator

=== Republican ===
- Timothy Griffin, U.S. Attorney

=== Polling ===
Poll Source	Dates Administered	Tim Griffin (R)	Joyce Elliott (D)	Lance Levi (I)	Lewis Kennedy (G)	Undecided
Talk Business Poll	August 17, 2010	52%	35%	3%	1%	9%

==== Predictions ====
Source	Ranking	As of
The Cook Political Report	Likely R (flip)	November 1, 2010
Rothenberg	Likely R (flip)	November 1, 2010
Sabato's Crystal Ball	Likely R (flip)	November 1, 2010
RCP	Likely R (flip)	November 1, 2010
CQ Politics	Likely R (flip)	October 28, 2010
New York Times	Safe R (flip)	November 1, 2010
FiveThirtyEight	Safe R (flip)	November 1, 2010

=== Results ===
U.S. Congress District 02 election
Party	Candidate	Votes	%
Republican	Tim Griffin	122,091	57.90
Democratic	Joyce Elliott	80,687	38.27
Independent	Lance Levi	4,421	2.10
Green	Lewis Kennedy	3,599	1.71
Write-ins		54	0.03
Total votes		210,852	100
Republican gain from Democratic			

== District 3 ==
2010 Arkansas's 3rd congressional district election
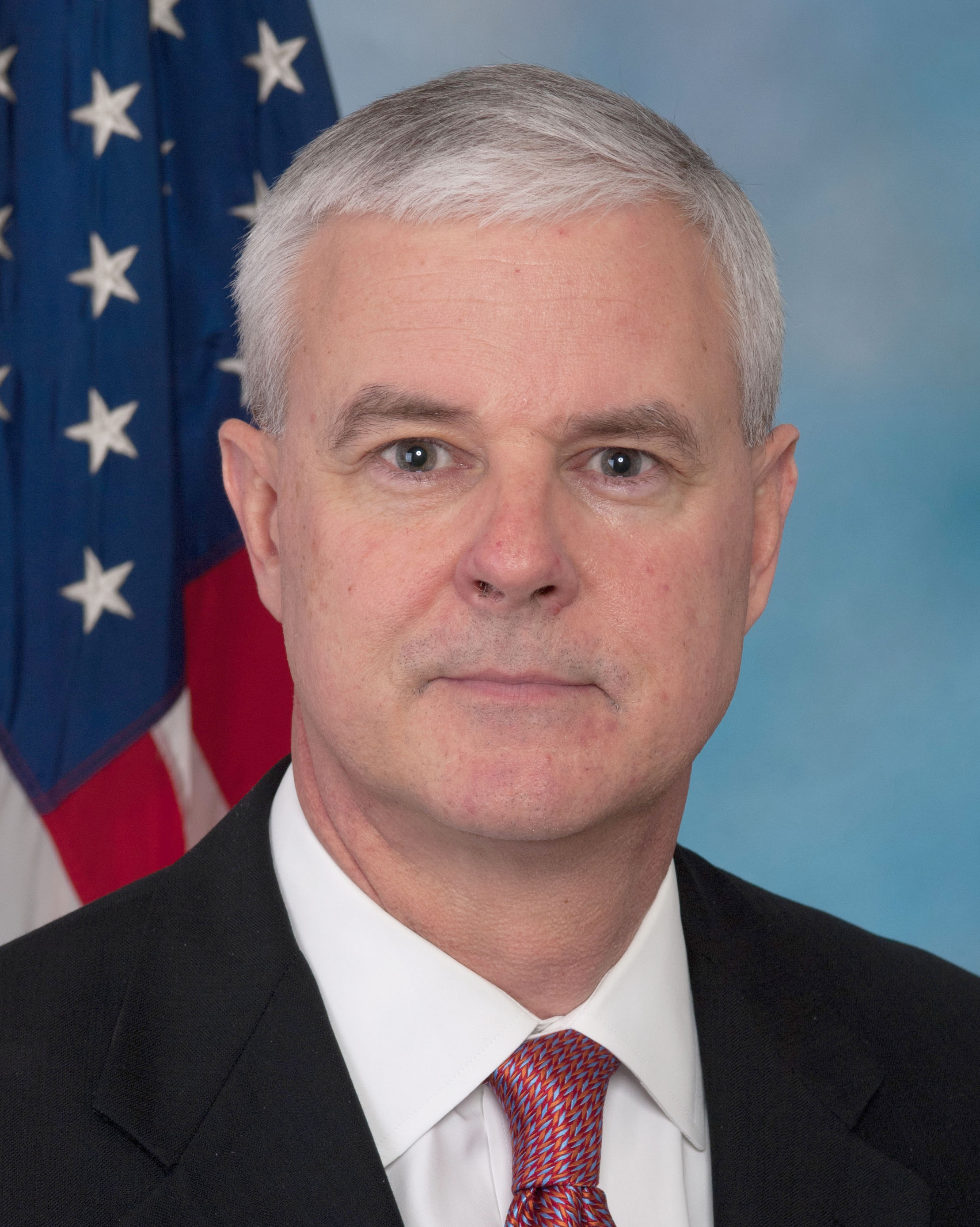

Nominee	Steve Womack	David Whitaker
Party	Republican	Democratic
Popular vote	148,581	56,542
Percentage	72.4%	27.6%
- County results Womack: 60–70% 70–80% 80–90%
U.S. Representative before election
John Boozman
Republican
Elected U.S. Representative
Steve Womack
Republican

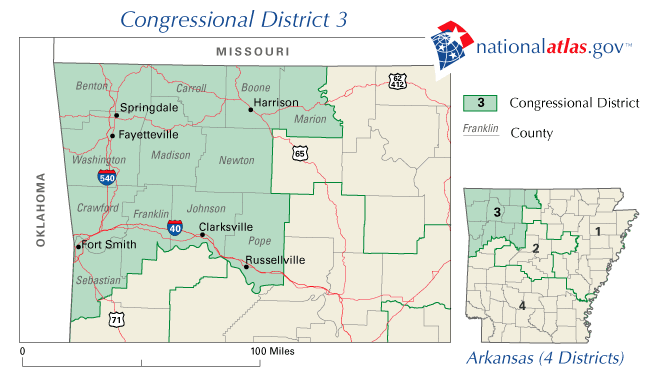
Arkansas's 3rd district

This district was represented by Republican John Boozman. Boozman has formally announced his 2010 plans for the U.S. Senate, against Blanche Lincoln. The district (comprising the northwest part of the state) has been held by the GOP since 1966.

- AR - District 3 from OurCampaigns.com
- Campaign Contributions from OpenSecrets
- 2010 Arkansas - 3rd District from CQ Politics
- Race profile at The New York Times

=== Democrat ===
- David Whitaker (campaign site, PVS), attorney

=== Republican ===
- Steve Womack, Mayor of Rogers

=== Independent ===
- Jerry Coon

=== Polling ===
Poll Source	Dates Administered	Steve Womack (R)	David Whitaker (D)	Undecided
Talk Business Poll	August 25, 2010	55%	31%	14%

==== Predictions ====
Source	Ranking	As of
The Cook Political Report	Safe R	November 1, 2010
Rothenberg	Safe R	November 1, 2010
Sabato's Crystal Ball	Safe R	November 1, 2010
RCP	Safe R	November 1, 2010
CQ Politics	Safe R	October 28, 2010
New York Times	Safe R	November 1, 2010
FiveThirtyEight	Safe R	November 1, 2010

=== Results ===
U.S. Congress District 03 election
Party	Candidate	Votes	%
Republican	Steve Womack	148,581	72.44
Democratic	David Whitaker	56,542	27.56
Total votes		205,123	100
Republican hold			

== District 4 ==
2010 Arkansas's 4th congressional district election
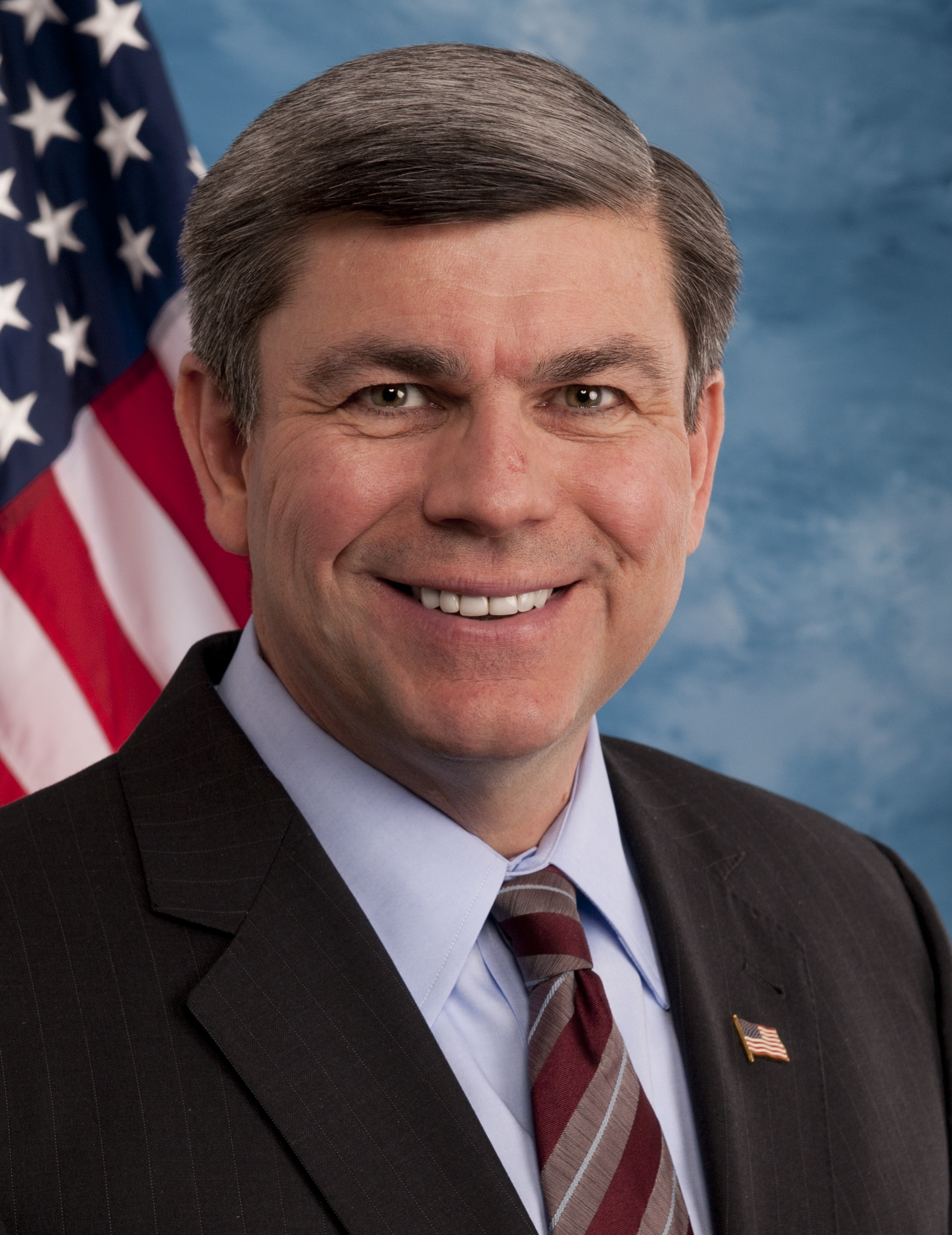

Nominee	Mike Ross	Beth Anne Rankin
Party	Democratic	Republican
Popular vote	102,749	71,526
Percentage	59.5%	40.2%
- County results Ross: 50–60% 60–70% 70–80% 80–90% Rankin: 40–50% 50–60%
U.S. Representative before election
Mike Ross
Democratic
Elected U.S. Representative
Mike Ross
Democratic

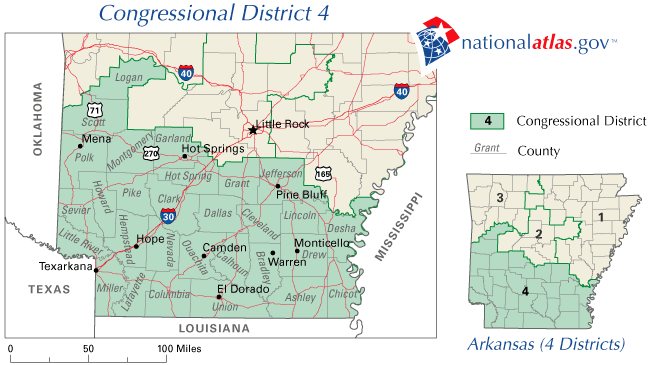
Arkansas's 4th district

This district was represented by Democrat Mike Ross. Ross ran for re-election.

- AR - District 4 from OurCampaigns.com
- Campaign Contributions from OpenSecrets
- 2010 Alabama - 4th District from CQ Politics
- Race profile at The New York Times

=== Democrat ===
- Mike Ross, incumbent U.S. Representative

=== Republican ===
- Beth Anne Rankin (campaign site, PVS), teacher and former Miss Arkansas

=== Green Party ===
- Josh Drake

=== Polling ===
Poll Source	Dates Administered	Mike Ross (D)	Beth Anne Rankin (R)	Joshua Drake (G)	Undecided
Talk Business Poll	August 25–26, 2010	49%	31%	4%	16%

==== Predictions ====
Source	Ranking	As of
The Cook Political Report	Likely D	November 1, 2010
Rothenberg	Safe D	November 1, 2010
Sabato's Crystal Ball	Safe D	November 1, 2010
RCP	Likely D	November 1, 2010
CQ Politics	Safe D	October 28, 2010
New York Times	Lean D	November 1, 2010
FiveThirtyEight	Safe D	November 1, 2010

=== Results ===
U.S. Congress District 04 election
Party	Candidate	Votes	%
Democratic	Mike Ross (incumbent)	102,479	57.53
Republican	Beth Anne Rankin	71,526	40.15
Green	Josh Drake	4,129	2.32
Total votes		178,134	100
Democratic hold			

== See also ==
- Arkansas elections, 2010
- Opinion polling for the United States House of Representatives elections, 2010#Arkansas
