= 2026 United States House of Representatives elections in Arkansas =

- November 3, 2026

All 4 Arkansas seats to the United States House of Representatives
- Reporting: 99% as of Nov 9, 1:37 PM EST
| | Majority party | Minority party |
|---|---|---|
| Party | Republican | Democratic |
| Last election | 4 | 0 |
| Seats won | 4 | 0 |
| Seat change | Steady | Steady |
| Popular vote | 513,166 | 348,643 |
| Percentage | 58.50% | 39.75% |
| Swing | ▼8.27% | ▲8.41% |

Republican
50–60%
60–70%
70–80%
80–90%
Democratic
50–60%
60–70%

The 2026 United States House of Representatives elections in Arkansas were held on November 3, 2026, to elect the four U.S. representatives from the state of Arkansas, one from all four of the state's congressional districts. The primary elections took place on March 3, 2026, and in races where no candidate received over 50% in a primary, runoff elections took place on March 31, 2026. Arkansas' U.S. House delegation has been exclusively Republican since 2013.

This elections took place alongside races for U.S. Senate, governor, state senate, state house, and numerous other state and local offices.

== Background ==
In Christian Ministerial Alliance v. Thurston, plaintiffs alleged racial gerrymandering diluting the voting power of black voters by splitting Little Rock into three districts. The case was heard in a federal district court. The panel ruled that it did not constitute a racial gerrymander and dismissed the case.

== District 1 ==
2026 Arkansas's 1st congressional district election
- Reporting: 99% as of Nov 9, 1:37 PM EST
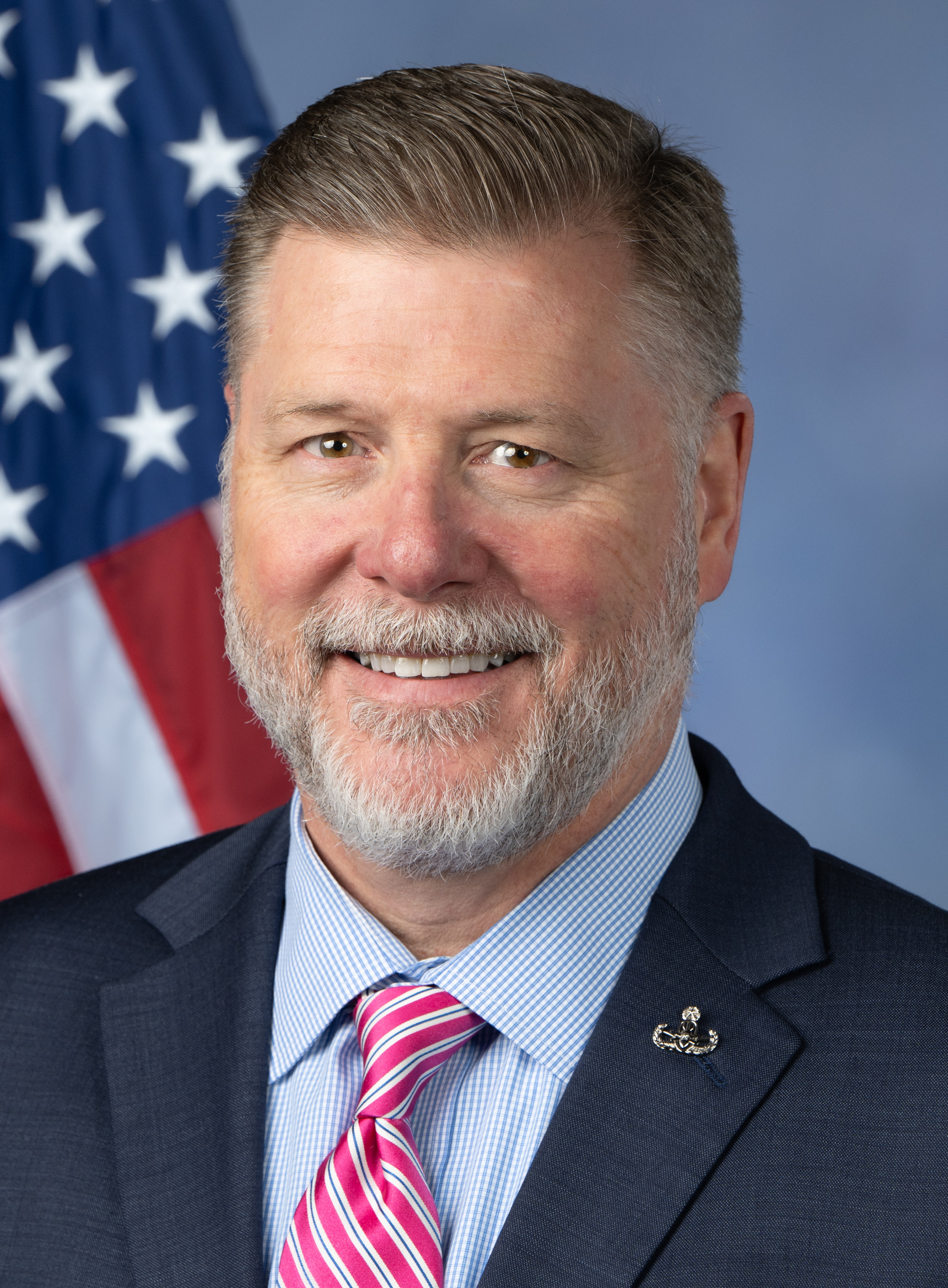

| Nominee | Rick Crawford | Terri Yarbrough Green |
| Party | Republican | Democratic |
| Popular vote | 127,100 | 60,150 |
| Percentage | 65.5% | 31.0% |
- County results Crawford: 50–60% 60–70% 70–80% Yarbrough Green: 50–60% 70–80%
U.S. Representative before election
Rick Crawford
Republican
Elected U.S. Representative
Rick Crawford
Republican

The 1st district is based in North-Eastern Arkansas and parts of its South-East, taking in Eudora, McGehee, Lonoke, and Stuttgart. The majority of its population can be found in the city of Jonesboro. The incumbent is Republican Rick Crawford, who was re-elected with 72.9% of the vote in 2024.

=== Republican primary ===
==== Nominee ====
- Rick Crawford, incumbent U.S. representative

==== Endorsements ====
Rick Crawford

Executive branch officials

- Donald Trump, President of the United States (2017–2021, 2025–present)

Organizations

- AIPAC

==== Fundraising ====
Campaign finance reports as of July 18, 2026
| Candidate | Raised | Spent | Cash on hand |
|---|---|---|---|
| Rick Crawford (R) | $944,302.03 | $743,498.30 | $1,031,630.59 |
Source: Federal Election Commission

=== Democratic primary ===
==== Nominee ====
- Terri Yarbrough Green, retired pathologist

==== Fundraising ====
Campaign finance reports as of July 18, 2026
| Candidate | Raised | Spent | Cash on hand |
|---|---|---|---|
| Terri Yarbrough Green (D) | $65,149.26 | $53,191.65 | $11,957.61 |
Source: Federal Election Commission

=== Candidates ===
==== Declared ====
- Steve Parsons (Libertarian), nominee for this district in 2024

=== General election ===
==== Predictions ====
| Source | Ranking | As of |
|---|---|---|
| Decision Desk HQ | Safe R | July 14, 2026 |
| The Cook Political Report | Solid R | March 13, 2025 |
| Inside Elections | Solid R | March 7, 2025 |
| Sabato's Crystal Ball | Safe R | April 10, 2025 |
| The Economist | Safe R | May 6, 2026 |
| Silver Bulletin | Solid R | August 20, 2026 |

==== Post-primary endorsements ====
Terri Green

Labor unions

- National Education Association

==== Fundraising ====
Campaign finance reports as of June 30, 2026
| Candidate | Raised | Spent | Cash on hand |
|---|---|---|---|
| Rick Crawford (R) | $944,302 | $743,498 | $1,031,631 |
| Terri Yarbrough (D) | $65,149 | $53,192 | $11,958 |
Source: Federal Election Commission

==== Results ====
2026 Arkansas's 1st congressional district election
| Party | Candidate | Votes | % | ±% |
|---|---|---|---|---|
| Republican | Rick Crawford (incumbent) | 127,100 | 65.5% | |
| Democratic | Terri Yarbrough | 60,150 | 31.0% | |
| Libertarian | Steve Parsons | 6,944 | 3.6% | |
| Total votes | | 194,194 | 100% | |

== District 2 ==
2026 Arkansas's 2nd congressional district election
- Reporting: 99% as of Nov 9, 1:37 PM EST
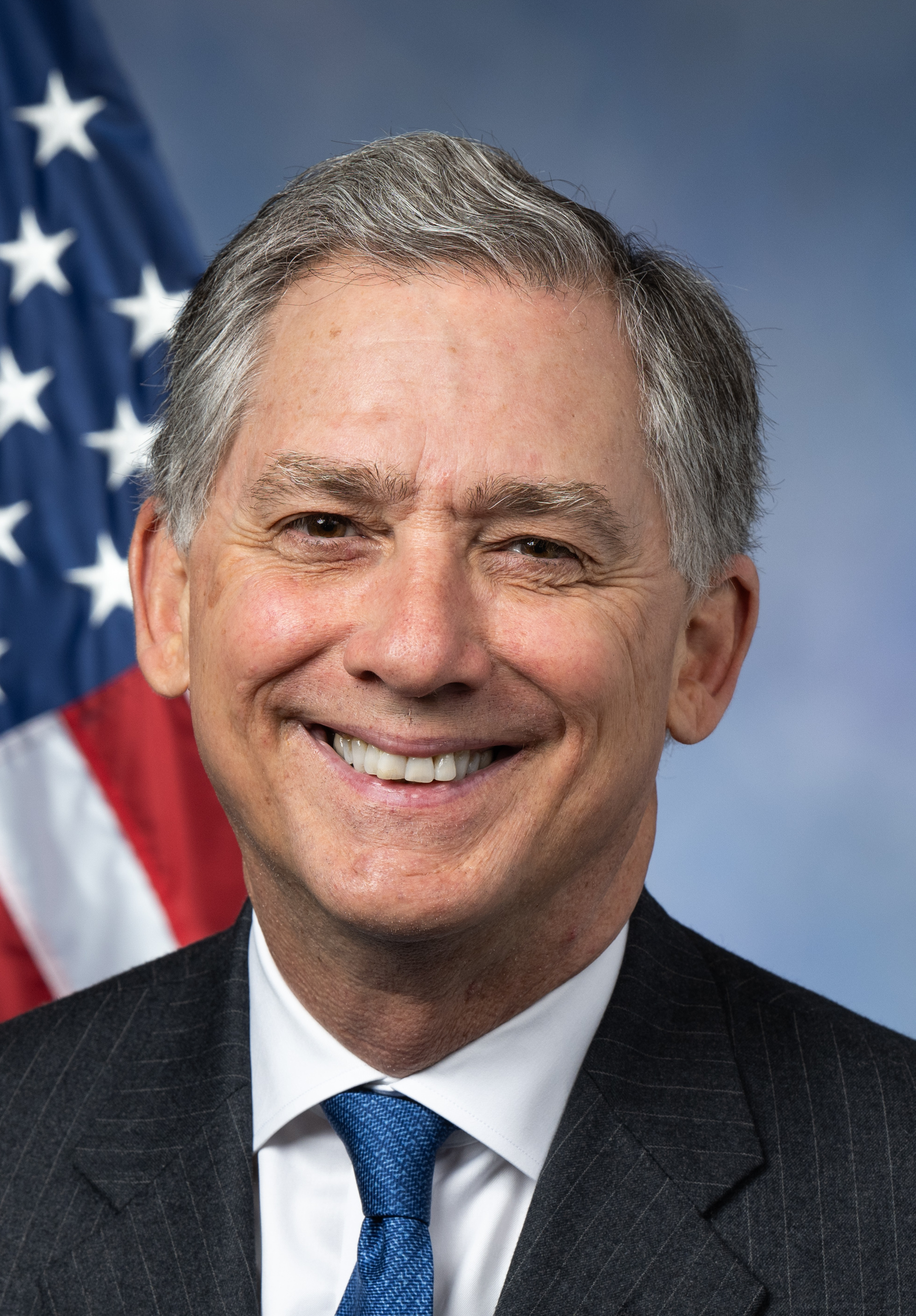

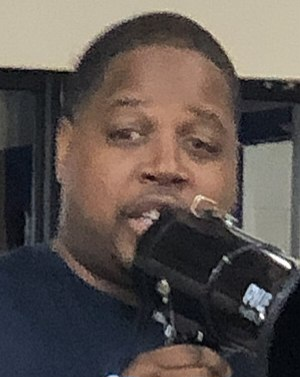
| Nominee | French Hill | Chris Jones |
| Party | Republican | Democratic |
| Popular vote | 127,452 | 123,096 |
| Percentage | 50.9% | 49.1% |
- County results Hill: 50–60% 60–70% 70–80% 80–90% Jones: 60–70%
U.S. Representative before election
French Hill
Republican
Elected U.S. Representative
French Hill
Republican

The 2nd district is located in central Arkansas, and includes most of the state capital of Little Rock, and the entirety of Cleburne, Conway, Faulkner, Perry, Saline, Van Buren and White counties. The incumbent is Republican French Hill, who was re-elected with 58.9% of the vote in 2024.

=== Republican primary ===
==== Nominee ====
- French Hill, incumbent U.S. representative

==== Eliminated in primary ====
- Chase McDowell, consultant and nominee for Arkansas State Representative District 5 in 2020

==== Endorsements ====
French Hill

Executive branch officials

- Donald Trump, president of the United States (2017–2021, 2025–present)

U.S. senators

- John Boozman, Arkansas (2011–present)
- Tom Cotton, Arkansas (2015–present)

Statewide officials

- Tim Griffin, attorney general of Arkansas (2023–present)
- Leslie Rutledge, lieutenant governor of Arkansas (2023–present)
- Sarah Huckabee Sanders, governor of Arkansas (2023–present)

Organizations

- AIPAC

==== Fundraising ====
Campaign finance reports as of July 18, 2026
| Candidate | Raised | Spent | Cash on hand |
|---|---|---|---|
| French Hill (R) | $4,421,509.93 | $2,830,320.69 | $2,967,541.43 |
| Chase McDowell (R) | $163,105.11 | $163,105.11 | $0.00 |
Source: Federal Election Commission

==== Results ====
Results by county Hill: 70–80%; 80–90%

Republican primary results
| Party | Candidate | Votes | % |
|---|---|---|---|
| Republican | French Hill (incumbent) | 49,079 | 76.8 |
| Republican | Chase McDowell | 14,830 | 23.2 |
| Total votes | | 63,909 | 100.0 |

=== Democratic primary ===
==== Nominee ====
- Chris Jones, nuclear engineer and nominee for governor in 2022

==== Eliminated in primary ====
- Zack Huffman, educator

==== Fundraising ====
Campaign finance reports as of July 18, 2026
| Candidate | Raised | Spent | Cash on hand |
|---|---|---|---|
| Zack Huffman (D) | $12,402.59 | $12,402.59 | $0 |
| Chris Jones (D) | $1,174,414.32 | $983,015.95 | $191,398.37 |
Source: Federal Election Commission

==== Results ====
Results by county Jones: 80–90%; 90–100%

Democratic primary results
| Party | Candidate | Votes | % |
|---|---|---|---|
| Democratic | Chris Jones | 47,512 | 92.6 |
| Democratic | Zack Huffman | 3,806 | 7.4 |
| Total votes | | 51,318 | 100.0 |

Results by county
| County | Huffman | | Jones | | Margin | | Total |
|---|---|---|---|---|---|---|---|
| Cleburne | 76 | 14.29% | 456 | 85.71% | 380 | 71.42% | 532 |
| Conway | 97 | 11.20% | 769 | 88.80% | 672 | 77.60% | 866 |
| Faulkner | 498 | 9.30% | 4,859 | 90.70% | 4,361 | 81.40% | 5,357 |
| Perry | 38 | 14.50% | 224 | 85.50% | 186 | 71.00% | 262 |
| Pulaski (part) | 2,190 | 5.80% | 35,566 | 94.20% | 33,376 | 88.40% | 37,756 |
| Saline | 583 | 12.18% | 4,202 | 87.82% | 3,619 | 75.64% | 4,785 |
| Van Buren | 58 | 14.99% | 329 | 85.01% | 271 | 70.02% | 387 |
| White | 266 | 19.37% | 1,107 | 80.63% | 841 | 61.26% | 1,373 |
| Totals | 3,806 | 7.42% | 47,512 | 92.58% | 43,706 | 85.16% | 51,318 |

=== General election ===
==== Predictions ====
| Source | Ranking | As of |
|---|---|---|
| Decision Desk HQ | Likely R | July 14, 2026 |
| The Cook Political Report | Likely R | October 9, 2026 |
| Inside Elections | Likely R | October 15, 2026 |
| Sabato's Crystal Ball | Likely R | September 16, 2026 |
| The Economist | Likely R | October 23, 2026 |
| Silver Bulletin | Likely R | August 20, 2026 |

==== Post-primary endorsements ====
Chris Jones (D)

Executive branch officials

- Pete Buttigieg, former secretary of transportation (2021–2025)
- Kamala Harris, 49th vice president of the United States (2021–2025)

U.S. representatives

- Suzan DelBene, WA-01 (2012–present)

Statewide officials

- Andy Beshear, governor of Kentucky (2019–present)
- JB Pritzker, governor of Illinois (2019–present)

Local officials

- Lottie Shackelford, former mayor of Little Rock (1987–1988)

Labor unions

- National Education Association
- United Auto Workers

Organizations

- The Collective PAC
- DCCC Red to Blue
- Moms Demand Action

Political parties

- Democratic Party of Arkansas

==== Fundraising ====
Campaign finance reports as of October 14, 2026
| Candidate | Raised | Spent | Cash on hand |
|---|---|---|---|
| French Hill (R) | $5,264,024 | $5,151,945 | $1,488,431 |
| Chris Jones (D) | $1,959,018 | $1,684,839 | $274,179 |
Source: Federal Election Commission

==== Polling ====
| Poll source | Date(s) administered | Sample size (Note: Key: A – all adults RV – registered voters LV – likely voters V – unclear) | Margin of error | French Hill (R) | Chris Jones (D) | Undecided |
|---|---|---|---|---|---|---|
| Emerson College (Note: Poll sponsored by Poll Vault) | October 12–14, 2026 | 383 (LV) | – | 52% | 48% | – |
| Hendrix College | August 12–13, 2026 | 1,112 (LV) | ± 5.3% | 44% | 48% | 8% |
| 2040 Strategy Group (D) (Note: Poll sponsored by Jones' campaign) | April 28 – May 8, 2026 | 660 (LV) | ± 3.5% | 43% | 46% | 11% |
| 2040 Strategy Group (D) | April 28 – May 8, 2026 | 660 (RV) | ± 3.5% | 41% | 47% | 12% |

==== Results ====
2026 Arkansas's 2nd congressional district election
| Party | Candidate | Votes | % | ±% |
|---|---|---|---|---|
| Republican | French Hill (incumbent) | 127,452 | 50.9% | |
| Democratic | Chris Jones | 123,096 | 49.1% | |
| Total votes | | 250,548 | 100% | |

== District 3 ==
2026 Arkansas's 3rd congressional district election
- Reporting: 99% as of Nov 9, 1:37 PM EST
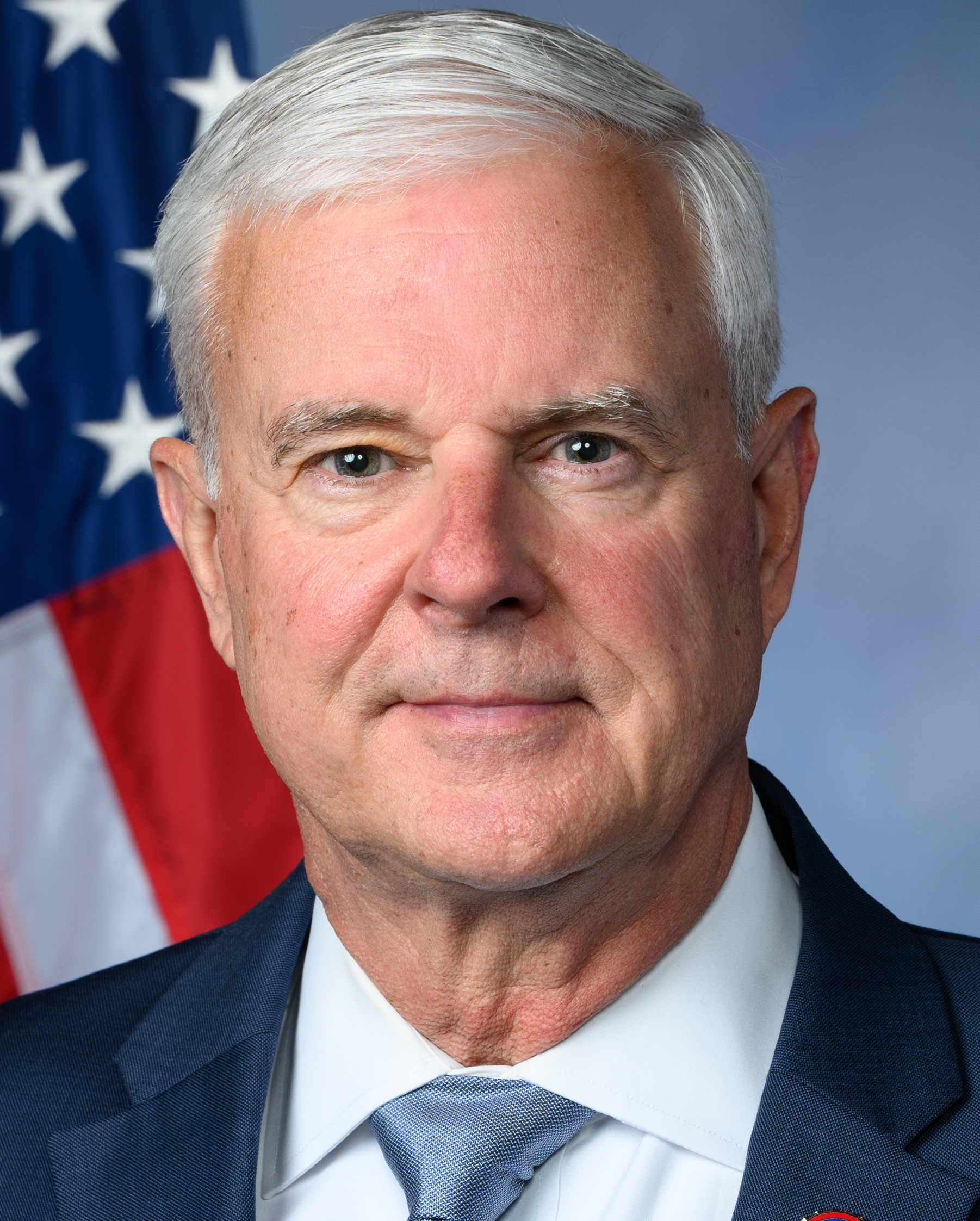

| Nominee | Steve Womack | Robb Ryerse |
| Party | Republican | Democratic |
| Popular vote | 127,304 | 96,211 |
| Percentage | 54.9% | 41.5% |
- County results Womack: 50–60% 60–70% 70–80% Ryerse: 50–60%
U.S. Representative before election
Steve Womack
Republican
Elected U.S. Representative
Steve Womack
Republican

The 3rd district encompasses the entirety of Benton, Carroll, Crawford, Madison, Sebastian and Washington counties. The incumbent is Republican Steve Womack, who was elected with 63.8% of the vote in 2024.

=== Republican primary ===
==== Nominee ====
- Steve Womack, incumbent U.S. representative

==== Endorsements ====
Steve Womack

Executive branch officials

- Donald Trump, President of the United States (2017–2021, 2025–present)

Organizations

- AIPAC

==== Fundraising ====
Campaign finance reports as of July 18, 2026
| Candidate | Raised | Spent | Cash on hand |
|---|---|---|---|
| Steve Womack (R) | $1,871,760.74 | $1,183,378.23 | $2,404,276.17 |
Source: Federal Election Commission

=== Democratic primary ===
==== Nominee ====
- Robb Ryerse, pastor and Republican candidate for this district in 2018

==== Withdrawn ====
- Diana Lawrence, former customer service, realtor, and substitute teacher

==== Endorsements ====
Robb Ryerse

Organizations

- Track AIPAC
- Vote Common Good

==== Fundraising ====
Italics indicate a withdrawn candidate.

Campaign finance reports as of July 18, 2026
| Candidate | Raised | Spent | Cash on hand |
|---|---|---|---|
| Diana Lawrence (D) | $12,930.72 | $12,930.72 | $0.00 |
| Robb Ryerse (D) | $120,526.35 | $114,575.79 | $5,950.56 |
Source: Federal Election Commission

=== Candidates ===
==== Declared ====
- Bobby Wilson (Libertarian), nominee for this district in 2024

==== Withdrawn ====
- Christopher Hocevar, graduate research assistant (did not file)

==== Fundraising ====
Campaign finance reports as of July 18, 2026
| Candidate | Raised | Spent | Cash on hand |
|---|---|---|---|
| Christopher Hocevar (I) | $1,631.83 | $1,443.04 | $188.79 |
Source: Federal Election Commission

=== General election ===
==== Predictions ====
| Source | Ranking | As of |
|---|---|---|
| Decision Desk HQ | Safe R | July 14, 2026 |
| The Cook Political Report | Solid R | March 13, 2025 |
| Inside Elections | Solid R | March 7, 2025 |
| Sabato's Crystal Ball | Safe R | April 10, 2025 |
| The Economist | Safe R | May 6, 2026 |
| Silver Bulletin | Solid R | August 20, 2026 |

==== Post-primary endorsements ====
Robb Ryerse

Labor unions

- National Education Association

Organizations

- Progressive Democrats of America

==== Fundraising ====
Campaign finance reports as of June 30, 2026
| Candidate | Raised | Spent | Cash on hand |
|---|---|---|---|
| Steve Womack (R) | $1,871,761 | $1,183,378 | $2,404,276 |
| Robb Ryerse (D) | $120,526 | $114,576 | $5,951 |
Source: Federal Election Commission

==== Results ====
2026 Arkansas's 3rd congressional district election
| Party | Candidate | Votes | % | ±% |
|---|---|---|---|---|
| Republican | Steve Womack (incumbent) | | | |
| Democratic | Robb Ryerse | | | |
| Libertarian | Bobby Wilson | | | |
| Total votes | | | | |

== District 4 ==
2026 Arkansas's 4th congressional district election
- Reporting: 99% as of Nov 9, 1:37 PM EST
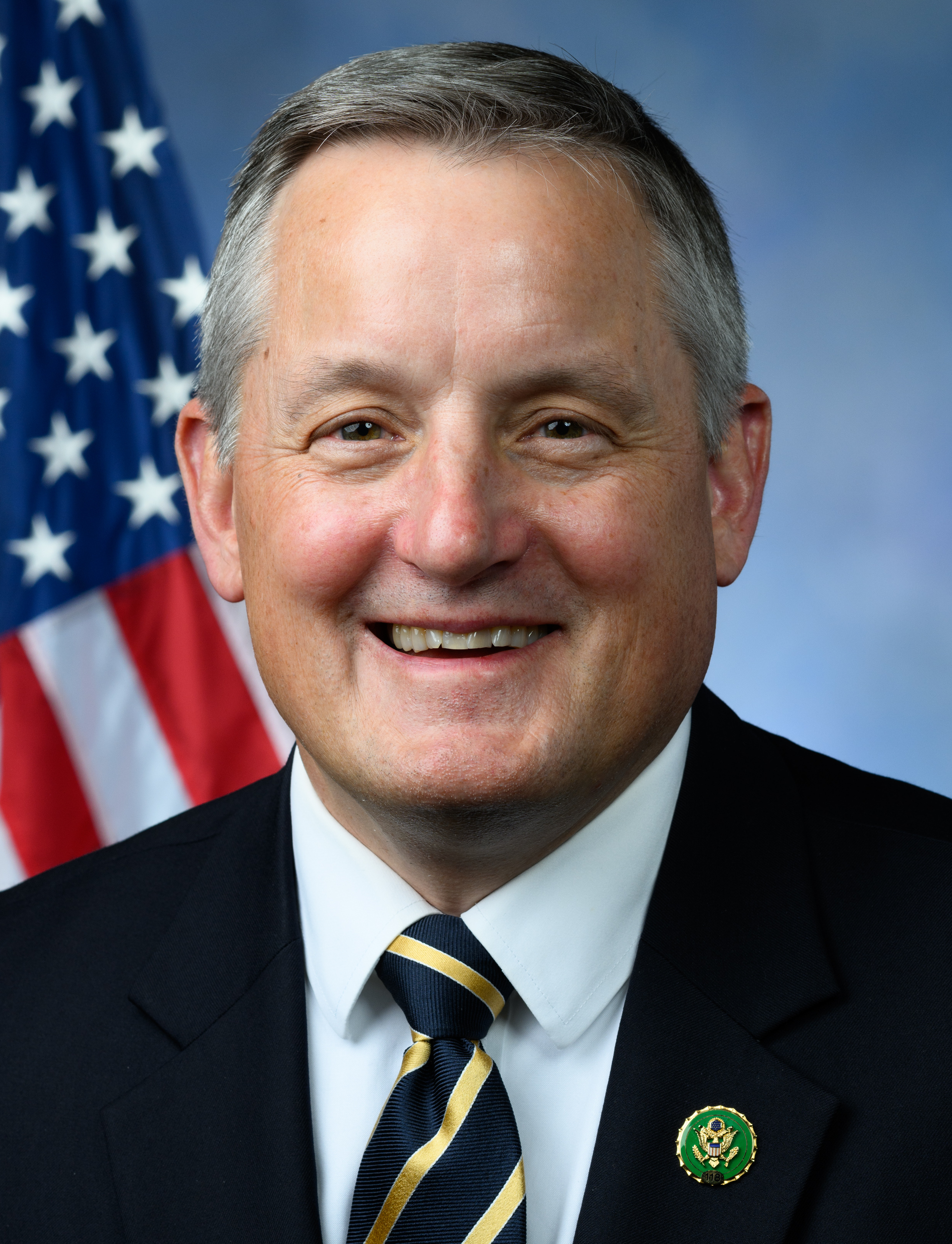

| Nominee | Bruce Westerman | James Russell |
| Party | Republican | Democratic |
| Popular vote | 131,310 | 69,186 |
| Percentage | 65.5% | 34.5% |
- County results Westerman: 50–60% 60–70% 70–80% 80–90% Russell: 60–70% 70–80%
U.S. Representative before election
Bruce Westerman
Republican
Elected U.S. Representative
TBD

The 4th district encompasses large parts of rural Arkansas, including the majority of its Southern half, and a stretch to the north-west which includes Pope County and others. It also shares part of the state capital, Little Rock with the 2nd district, though it is a smaller portion. The incumbent is Republican Bruce Westerman, who was elected with 72.9% of the vote in 2024.

=== Republican primary ===
==== Nominee ====
- Bruce Westerman, incumbent U.S. representative

==== Endorsements ====
Bruce Westerman

Executive branch officials

- Donald Trump, President of the United States (2017–2021, 2025–present)

Organizations

- AIPAC

==== Fundraising ====
Campaign finance reports as of July 18, 2026
| Candidate | Raised | Spent | Cash on hand |
|---|---|---|---|
| Bruce Westerman (R) | $2,562,973.36 | $928,087.20 | $4,668,446.56 |
Source: Federal Election Commission

=== Democratic primary ===
==== Nominee ====
- James Russell, mental health advocate and candidate for governor in 2022 (previously ran for U.S. Senate)

==== Eliminated in primary ====
- Steven O'Donnell, Navy veteran and small business owner

==== Results ====
Results by county Russell: 50–60%; 60–70%; O'Donnell: 50–60%; 60–70%

Democratic primary results
| Party | Candidate | Votes | % |
|---|---|---|---|
| Democratic | James Russell | 13,092 | 53.0 |
| Democratic | Steven O'Donnell | 11,616 | 47.0 |
| Total votes | | 24,708 | 100.0 |

=== General election ===
==== Predictions ====
| Source | Ranking | As of |
|---|---|---|
| Decision Desk HQ | Safe R | July 14, 2026 |
| The Cook Political Report | Solid R | February 6, 2025 |
| Inside Elections | Solid R | March 7, 2025 |
| Sabato's Crystal Ball | Safe R | April 10, 2025 |
| The Economist | Safe R | May 6, 2026 |
| Silver Bulletin | Solid R | August 20, 2026 |

==== Post-primary endorsements ====
James Russell

Labor unions

- National Education Association

==== Fundraising ====
Campaign finance reports as of June 30, 2026
| Candidate | Raised | Spent | Cash on hand |
|---|---|---|---|
| Bruce Westerman (R) | $2,562,973 | $928,087 | $4,668,447 |
| James Russell (D) | $5,853 | $5,628 | $907 |
Source: Federal Election Commission

==== Results ====
2026 Arkansas's 4th congressional district election
| Party | Candidate | Votes | % | ±% |
|---|---|---|---|---|
| Republican | Bruce Westerman (incumbent) | | | |
| Democratic | James Russell | | | |
| Total votes | | | | |

== Notes ==
Partisan clients

== See also ==
- Elections in Arkansas
- Political party strength in Arkansas
- Arkansas Democratic Party
- Arkansas Republican Party
- Government of Arkansas
- 2026 United States Senate election in Arkansas
- 2026 United States House of Representatives elections
- 2026 United States elections
