= 2026 United States Senate election in Arkansas =

- November 3, 2026

Nominee	Tom Cotton	Hallie Shoffner
Party	Republican	Democratic
Popular vote	481,495	377,108
Percentage	54.21%	42.46%
- Cotton: 40–50% 50–60% 60–70% 70–80% Shoffner: 40–50% 50–60% 60–70%
U.S. senator before election
Tom Cotton
Republican
Elected U.S. senator
Tom Cotton
Republican

The 2026 United States Senate election in Arkansas took place on November 3, 2026, to elect a senator to represent the state. Republican incumbent Tom Cotton secured a third term, defeating Democratic challenger and farmer Hallie Shoffner.

In the primary elections held on March 3, 2026, Cotton faced minimal opposition and captured the Republican nomination with 81.6% of the vote, while Shoffner secured the Democratic nomination with 78.3%, defeating Lewisville Mayor Ethan Dunbar.

== Republican primary ==
=== Candidates ===
==== Nominee ====
- Tom Cotton, incumbent U.S. senator (2015–present)

==== Eliminated in primary ====
- Jeb Little, state trooper
- Micah Ashby, pastor

=== Endorsements ===
Tom Cotton

Executive branch officials

- Donald Trump, president of the United States (2017–2021, 2025–present)

U.S. representatives

- Rick Crawford, AR-01 (2011–present)
- French Hill, AR-02 (2015–present)
- Steve Womack, AR-03 (2011–present)
- Bruce Westerman, AR-04 (2015–present)

Statewide officials

- Sarah Huckabee Sanders, governor of Arkansas (2023–present)

Organizations

- AIPAC
- Susan B. Anthony Pro-Life America

Newspapers

- Arkansas Democrat-Gazette

=== Fundraising ===
Campaign finance reports as of February 11, 2026
Candidate	Raised	Spent	Cash on hand
Micah Ashby (R)	$41,162	$126	$754
Tom Cotton (R)	$11,880,970	$8,607,793	$9,670,131
Jeb Little (R)	$54,598	$43,830	$10,768
Source: Federal Election Commission

=== Results ===
Results by county Cotton: 50–60%; 60–70%; 70–80%; 80–90%; 90–100%

Republican primary results
Party	Candidate	Votes	%
Republican	Tom Cotton (incumbent)	230,209	81.6
Republican	Micah Ashby	26,040	9.2
Republican	Jeb Little	25,724	9.1
Total votes		281,973	100.0

== Democratic primary ==
=== Candidates ===
==== Nominee ====
- Hallie Shoffner, farmer and entrepreneur

==== Eliminated in primary ====
- Ethan Dunbar, mayor of Lewisville (2019–present)

==== Withdrawn ====
- James Russell, small business owner and candidate for governor in 2022 (running for U.S. House)

=== Endorsements ===
Hallie Shoffner

Newspapers

- Arkansas Democrat-Gazette

=== Fundraising ===
Campaign finance reports as of February 11, 2026
Candidate	Raised	Spent	Cash on hand
Ethan Dunbar (D)	$15,956	$17,411	$3,717
Hallie Shoffner (D)	$1,237,490	$733,520	$503,970
Source: Federal Election Commission

=== Results ===
Results by county Shoffner: 50–60%; 60–70%; 70–80%; 80–90%; 90–100%; Dunbar: 50–60%; 60–70%; 80–90%

Democratic primary results
Party	Candidate	Votes	%
Democratic	Hallie Shoffner	102,289	78.3
Democratic	Ethan Dunbar	28,394	21.7
Total votes		130,683	100.0

== Libertarian primary ==
=== Candidates ===
==== Nominee ====
- Jeff Wadlin, strategy consultant

== General election ==
=== Predictions ===
Source	Ranking	As of
The Cook Political Report	Solid R	November 2, 2026
Decision Desk HQ	Safe R	November 3, 2026
The Economist (Note: The Economist's prediction model uses unconventional terminology. For the purpose of equivalency, their "Very Likely" ratings are formatted as a "Likely" rating while "Likely" ratings are formatted as a "Lean" rating.)	Safe R	November 3, 2026
FiftyPlusOne	Safe R	November 3, 2026
Fox News	Solid R	November 1, 2026
Inside Elections	Solid R	October 29, 2026
MS NOW	Safe R	October 29, 2026
NBC News	Solid R	November 3, 2026
RealClearPolitics	Solid R	November 2, 2026
Sabato's Crystal Ball	Safe R	November 2, 2026
Silver Bulletin	Solid R	November 3, 2026
Split Ticket	Safe R	November 2, 2026

=== Post-primary endorsements ===
Tom Cotton (R)

Organizations

- NRA Political Victory Fund
Hallie Shoffner (D)

U.S. senators

- Blanche Lincoln, former Senator from Arkansas (1999–2011)

Statewide officials

- Mike Beebe, former governor of Arkansas (2007–2015)

Labor unions

- Arkansas AFL-CIO
- National Education Association

Organizations

- National Women's Political Caucus

=== Debates ===
2026 Arkansas U.S. Senate election debates
No.	Date	Host	Moderator	Link	Democratic	Libertarian	Republican
Key: P Participant A Absent N Not invited I Invited W Withdrawn							
Key: P Participant A Absent N Not invited I Invited W Withdrawn					Hallie Shoffner	Jeff Wadlin	Tom Cotton
1	October 12, 2026	Arkansas TV	Steve Barnes	YouTube	P	P	A

=== Fundraising ===
Campaign finance reports as of October 14, 2026
Candidate	Raised	Spent	Cash on hand
Tom Cotton (R)	$14,517,576	$15,784,601	$5,129,928
Hallie Shoffner (D)	$4,042,811	$3,285,879	$756,932
Source: Federal Election Commission

=== Polling ===
Aggregate polls

Source of poll aggregation	Dates administered	Dates updated	Tom Cotton (R)	Hallie Shoffner (D)	Other/ Undecided (Note: Calculated by taking the difference of 100% and all other candidates combined.)	Margin
Silver Bulletin	through October 28, 2026	November 3, 2026	52.8%	39.8%	7.4%	Cotton +13.0%

Poll source	Date(s) administered	Sample size (Note: Key: A – all adults RV – registered voters LV – likely voters V – unclear)	Margin of error	Tom Cotton (R)	Hallie Shoffner (D)	Other	Undecided
GrayHouse (R)	October 27–28, 2026	509 (LV)	± 4.3%	55% (Note: With voters who lean toward a given candidate)	39%	4% (Note: Jeff Waldin (L) with 4%)	2%
GrayHouse (R)	October 27–28, 2026	509 (LV)	± 4.3%	51%	37%	4%	8%
Hendrix College (Note: Poll sponsored by Talk Business & Politics)	October 8–13, 2026	709 (LV)	± 5.0%	50%	41%	5% (Note: Jeff Waldin (L) with 5%)	5%
GrayHouse (R)	September 30 – October 4, 2026	550 (LV)	± 4.2%	51%	40%	4%	5%
GrayHouse (R)	September 30 – October 4, 2026	550 (LV)	± 4.2%	50%	39%	4%	7%
J.L. Partners	August 14–18, 2026	803 (LV)	± 3.5%	51%	35%	4%	11%
Hendrix College	August 11–12, 2026	1,217 (LV)	± 4.7%	44%	47%	3% (Note: Jeff Waldin (L) with 3%)	6%
2040 Strategy Group (D) (Note: Poll sponsored by Shoffner's campaign)	July 17–25, 2026	586 (LV)	± 4.0%	46%	43%	—	11%
	March 3, 2026	Primary elections					
GrayHouse (R) (Note: Poll sponsored by America One Policies)	February 7–9, 2026	550 (LV)	± 4.2%	58%	36%	—	7%

=== Results ===
2026 United States Senate election in Arkansas
Party	Candidate	Votes	%	±%
Republican	Tom Cotton (incumbent)	481,495	54.21	–12.27
Democratic	Hallie Shoffner	377,108	42.46	N/A
Libertarian	Jeff Wadlin	29,539	3.33	–30.14
Total votes		888,142	100.0	N/A
Republican hold				

==== Counties that flipped from Republican to Democratic ====
- Chicot (largest municipality: Dermott)
- Crittenden (largest municipality: West Memphis)
- Desha (largest municipality: Dumas)
- Lee (largest municipality: Marianna)
- St. Francis (largest municipality: Forrest City)
- Washington (largest municipality: Fayetteville)

==== Counties that flipped from Libertarian to Democratic ====
- Jefferson (largest municipality: Pine Bluff)
- Phillips (largest municipality: Helena–West Helena)
- Pulaski (largest municipality: Little Rock)

==== By congressional district ====
Cotton won three congressional districts, while Shoffner won one congressional district, which elected a Republican.

District	Shoffner	Cotton	Representative
1st	34.62%	61.74%	Rick Crawford
2nd	49.35%	47.78%	French Hill
3rd	46.90%	50.01%	Steve Womack
4th	35.99%	59.84%	Bruce Westerman

== See also ==
- 2026 United States elections
- 2026 Arkansas elections
- 2026 United States House of Representatives elections in Arkansas
- 2026 Arkansas gubernatorial election
- 2026 Arkansas House of Representatives election

== Notes ==
Partisan and media clients
