= Hallie Shoffner =

American political candidate (born 1987)

- Shoffner in 2026

Personal details
- Born: Hallie Louise Shoffner; August 31, 1987 (age 39) Jackson County, Arkansas, U.S.
- Party: Democratic
- Spouse: Michael Sullivan
- Children: 1
- Education: Vanderbilt University (BA); University of Arkansas (MPS)
- Website: Campaign website

Hallie Louise Shoffner (born August 31, 1987) is an American farmer and political candidate. She previously managed her family's rice and soybean farm, a seed company, and founded an agricultural food hub.

Shoffner was the Democratic nominee for the 2026 United States Senate election in Arkansas, in which she was defeated by Republican incumbent Tom Cotton.

== Early life and education ==
In 1987, Shoffner was born to John and Wendy Shoffner, who had just moved back from Texas. Shoffner grew up on a rice and soybean family farm that had been operated by her family for six generations in Shoffner, a community near Newport, Arkansas in Jackson County, Arkansas that was named for her family. She earned a black belt in karate at age 17.

Shoffner attended Newport High School. She earned a bachelor's degree in Spanish from Vanderbilt University on a full ride Robert Harvey Scholarship. During college, studied abroad at the Universidad Complutense in Madrid. In 2011, she graduated with a Master of Public Service from the Clinton School of Public Service at the University of Arkansas. As a student, Shoffner worked for Centro de Promoción y Defensa de Derechos Sexuales y Reproductivos (PROMSEX), a nonprofit organization that combats gender inequality in Peru.

From 2011 to 2012, Shoffner was executive director of Seis Puentes, a nonprofit serving Hispanic and Latino Americans in North Little Rock. In 2012, Shoffner was deputy campaign manager for Arkansas state representative Tracy Steele's run for mayor of North Little Rock. Steele led the general election 48–41 but lost the runoff 45–55. In 2013, Shoffner moved to downtown Little Rock and worked for public relations firm Advantage Communications.

== Agricultural career ==
In 2016, after her father developed dementia, Shoffner returned to work on her family's 2,000-acre (810 ha) farm. In 2019, she became chief executive of the family seed company, SFR Seed. The business grew rice and soybeans and operated a seed-research farm.

Shoffner adopted conservation practices including reduced tillage, cover crops, electric irrigation wells and intermittent flooding of rice fields. She said these changes were intended to improve soil conservation and soil health, water conservation, and ultimately make the farm more resilient to drought, flooding, and hotter nights. In 2022, she was honored by Garden & Gun as a champion of conservation, employing sustainable agricultural techniques, and was featured in a Fendt video. Little Rock Soirée listed Shoffner in its 2023 "Top 100 Women of Impact" in the state. In 2024, she received AgWeb's Top Producer of the Year Next Gen Award and was featured in World Wildlife magazine's spring 2026 issue; Yale Climate Connections covered Shoffner's sustainable techniques. In January 2024, she was announced as one of 60 Presidential Leadership Scholars.

In 2024, she founded Delta Harvest, a food hub intended to help small and midsize farmers diversify into specialty crops and reach institutional and commercial buyers. Its projects included specialty-rice production with Black and women farmers in the Mississippi Delta.

In February 2025, Shoffner's family stopped farming after financial projections showed no profitable planting scenario. Shoffner attributed the closure to low commodity prices, rising input costs, tariffs and federal agricultural policy. The family liquidated most of the operation but retained land it owned.

== Political career ==
=== 2026 Senate campaign ===
Arkansas has not elected a Democrat to statewide office since 2010. In July 2025, Shoffner launched her campaign for the class 2 US Senate seat held by incumbent Tom Cotton, whom she criticized for voting against the 2013 and 2018 Farm Bills. Shoffner cited her family farm's closure as an example of an economy that puts "corporations and politicians" ahead of disadvantaged working people and farmers. Her campaign has focused on lowering household costs, changing farm policy, and protecting Medicaid and Social Security.

In the March 3, 2026, Democratic primary, Shoffner defeated Lewisville mayor Ethan Dunbar with 78.27% of the vote. Former Democratic senator Blanche Lincoln endorsed Shoffner in July.

On July 3, 2026, a man armed with a large hunting knife visited Shoffner's home looking for Anna-Lee Pittman, Shoffner's campaign manager. Shoffner responded by hiring additional security and condemmed political violence. As of July 9, 2026, an investigation is underway; no suspect has been identified.

Shoffner debated Libertarian nominee Jeff Wadlin October 12; Cotton refused to attend. Shoffner was defeated by Cotton in the general election, receiving 42% of the vote.

== Political positions ==
Shoffner has been described as a center-left Democrat and a prairie populist.

=== Agriculture and rural development ===
Shoffner has called for federal farm policy to place less emphasis on commodity crops and to help farmers diversify into food and specialty crops. She has argued that local processing and distribution infrastructure could raise farm income while addressing food insecurity in Arkansas. She supports continued federal disaster assistance and investment in roads, water systems, rail and other rural infrastructure. Shoffner advocates financial incentives and technical support for farmers who adopt conservation practices in order to adapt to climate change.

=== Data centers ===
Shoffner opposed Cotton's proposed DATA Act, which would ease federal regulation of power generation built for data centers, arguing that the Arkansas Public Service Commission should oversee data-center energy costs and that privately operated natural-gas plants could increase local pollution.

=== Economic policy ===
Shoffner supports lower taxes for blue-collar workers, protection of Social Security, and expanded health coverage. She has said that elected officials should place their assets in blind trusts and be prohibited from trading individual stocks. Shoffner attended the May Day rally in Little Rock, where she supported the right to organize labor unions. Shoffner supports limits on election spending from corporations and megadonors. Shoffner opposed the One Big Beautiful Bill Act, arguing that it enormously expanded the deficit and provided tax breaks to those already well-off, and says she wants to shrink the US deficit.

In March 2026, Shoffner criticized Senate Democratic leader Chuck Schumer, asking, ". . . what does he know about affordability?"

=== Foreign policy ===
Shoffner sharply criticized President Donald Trump's war with Iran, arguing that the war raised fuel and fertilizer prices for Arkansas households and farmers while disrupting global supply chains.

=== Healthcare ===
In a 2026 interview with Axios, Shoffner described her goals for the expansion of what Medicare covers as the need for investing in telehealth and federally qualified health centers. Along with this would be to increase financing for medical residencies. Forgiving student loans for doctors, nurses, and social workers is also a position that she takes. Increasing Medicaid reimbursements is also a position that she takes as well. She said in the interview that:

What our politicians don't understand is that Medicaid — when it comes to rural health care — I mean, that's not just health care. That's economic infrastructure because that's the revenue structure for many rural hospitals, many clinics, many health care workers.

=== Immigration ===
In July 2026, when asked whether she would "defund ICE as it is now", Shoffner said yes and said that U.S. Immigration and Customs Enforcement required oversight and accountability. Shoffner later said she favored reforming rather than eliminating ICE.

== Personal life ==
Shoffner met Michael Sullivan, University of Arkansas at Little Rock-educated co-founder of Sullivan Wright Technologies and former vet tech, in 2010. They were married in 2015 and have a son born in 2018. As of 2026, she resides in Little Rock's Pettaway neighborhood. She has a dog, Poppy; in October 2025, she shared on social media that her 15-year-old dog Jack had passed. Shoffner is a Star Trek fan and runs a Substack blog. She is fluent in Spanish. Shoffner is Christian.

== Electoral history ==
=== U.S. Senate ===
2026 United States Senate election in Arkansas
Party	Candidate	Votes	%
Democratic	Hallie Shoffner	102,289	78.27
Democratic	Ethan Dunbar	28,394	21.73
Total votes		130,683	100.00
General election
Republican	Tom Cotton (incumbent)		
Democratic	Hallie Shoffner		
Libertarian	Jeff Wadlin		
Total votes			

Party political offices
Vacant Title last held by Mark Pryor; 2014	Democratic nominee for U.S. Senator from Arkansas (Class 2); 2026	Most recent
