= Tom Cotton =

American politician (born 1977)

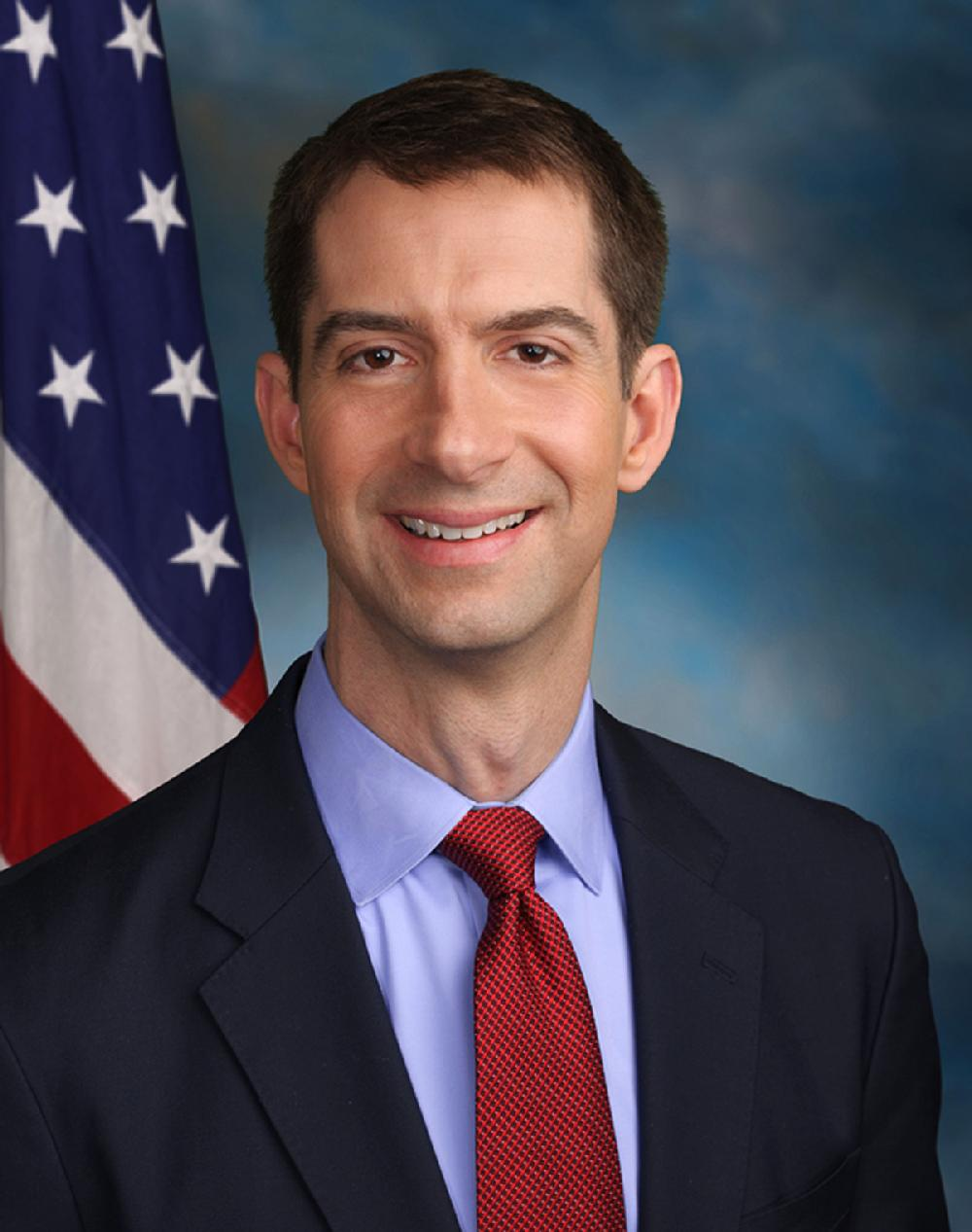
- Official portrait, 2015

Chair of the Senate Republican Conference
- Incumbent
- Assumed office January 3, 2025
- Leader: John Thune
- Preceded by: John Barrasso

Chair of the Senate Intelligence Committee
- Incumbent
- Assumed office January 3, 2025
- Preceded by: Mark Warner

United States Senator from Arkansas
- Incumbent
- Assumed office January 3, 2015 Serving with John Boozman
- Preceded by: Mark Pryor

Member of the U.S. House of Representatives from Arkansas's 4th district
- In office January 3, 2013 – January 3, 2015
- Preceded by: Mike Ross
- Succeeded by: Bruce Westerman

Personal details
- Born: Thomas Bryant Cotton; May 13, 1977 (age 49) Dardanelle, Arkansas, U.S.
- Party: Republican
- Spouse: Anna Peckham (m. 2014)
- Children: 2
- Education: Harvard University (BA, JD); Claremont Graduate University (attended)
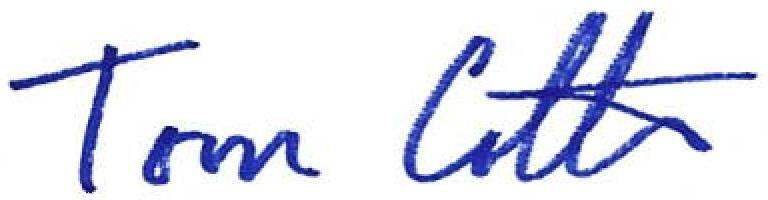
- Signature
- Website: Senate website Campaign website

Military service
- Branch: United States Army; Army Reserve
- Years of service: 2005–2009 (active); 2010–2013 (reserve)
- Rank: Captain
- Unit: 506th Infantry Regiment; 101st Airborne Division; 3rd Infantry Regiment (The Old Guard)
- Wars: War in Afghanistan; Iraq War
- Awards: Bronze Star Medal; Army Commendation Medal (2); Army Achievement Medal; Air Force Achievement Medal; See more

Thomas Bryant Cotton (born May 13, 1977) is an American politician and former Army officer serving since 2015 as the junior United States senator from Arkansas. From 2013 to 2015 he served in the U.S. House of Representatives, representing Arkansas's 4th congressional district. He is a member of the Republican Party.

Cotton was elected to the House in 2012 and to the Senate in 2014, defeating incumbent Mark Pryor. He is chair of the Senate Republican Conference and the Senate Intelligence Committee.

== Early life and education ==
Thomas Bryant Cotton was born on May 13, 1977, in Dardanelle, Arkansas. His father, Thomas Leonard "Len" Cotton, was a district supervisor in the Arkansas Department of Health, and his mother, Avis (née Bryant) Cotton, was a schoolteacher who later became principal of their district's middle school. Cotton's family had lived in rural Arkansas for seven generations, and he grew up on his family's cattle farm. He attended Dardanelle High School, where he played on the local and regional basketball teams; standing 6 ft 5 in (1.96 m) tall, he was usually required to play center.

Cotton was accepted to Harvard College after graduating from high school in 1995. At Harvard, he majored in government and served on the editorial board of The Harvard Crimson, often dissenting from the liberal majority. In articles, Cotton addressed what he saw as "sacred cows" such as affirmative action. He was a Claremont Institute Publius Fellow in 1997. He graduated with an A.B. magna cum laude in 1998 after only three years of study. Cotton's senior thesis focused on The Federalist Papers.

After graduating from Harvard College in 1998, Cotton was accepted into a master's program at Claremont Graduate University. He left in 1999, saying that he found academic life "too sedentary", and instead enrolled at Harvard Law School, graduating with his Juris Doctor in 2002.

== Career ==
After graduating from Harvard Law School, Cotton spent one year as a law clerk for Judge Jerry Edwin Smith of the U.S. Court of Appeals for the Fifth Circuit. He then went into private practice as an associate at law firms Gibson, Dunn & Crutcher and Cooper & Kirk in Washington, D.C., until he commissioned in the U.S. Army in 2005.

== Military service ==
On January 11, 2005, Cotton commissioned in the United States Army. He entered Officer Candidate School (OCS) in March 2005 and was commissioned as a second lieutenant in June. He completed Ranger School, a 62-day small unit tactics and leadership program that earned him the Ranger tab, and Airborne School to earn the Parachutist Badge.

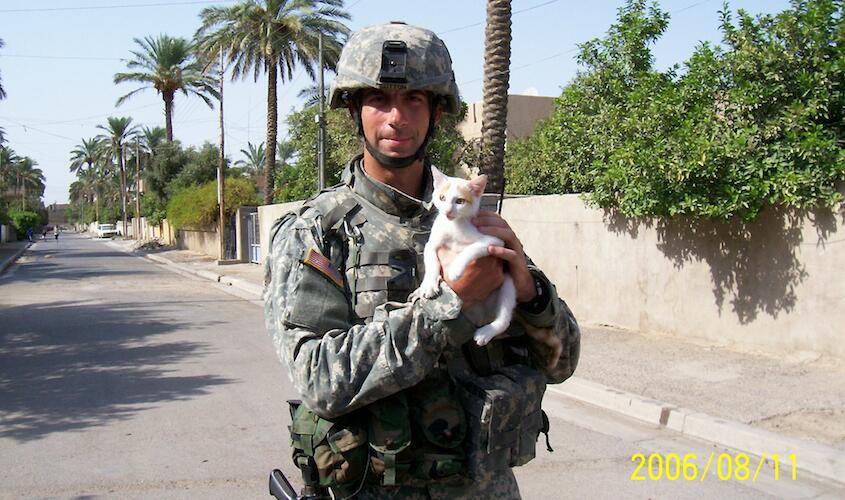
Cotton in Baghdad, 2006

In May 2006, Cotton was deployed to Baghdad as part of Operation Iraqi Freedom (OIF) as a platoon leader with the 101st Airborne Division. In Iraq, he led a 41-man air assault infantry platoon in the 506th Infantry Regiment, and planned and performed daily combat patrols. In December 2006 Cotton was promoted to first lieutenant and reassigned to the 3rd U.S. Infantry Regiment (The Old Guard) at Fort Myer in Arlington, Virginia, as a platoon leader.

From October 2008 to July 2009, Cotton was deployed to eastern Afghanistan. He was assigned within the Train Advise Assist Command – East at its Gamberi forward operating base (FOB) in Laghman Province as the operations officer of a Provincial Reconstruction Team (PRT), where he planned daily counter-insurgency and reconstruction operations.

Cotton was honorably discharged in September 2009. During his time in the service, he completed two combat deployments overseas, was awarded a Bronze Star, two Army Commendation Medals, a Combat Infantryman Badge, a Ranger tab, an Afghanistan Campaign Medal, and an Iraq Campaign Medal.

After his active-duty service, Cotton joined the management consulting firm McKinsey & Company.

In July 2010, Cotton entered the Army Reserve (USAR). He was discharged in May 2013.

=== 2006 letter to The New York Times ===
In June 2006, while stationed in Iraq, Cotton gained public attention after writing an open letter to the editor of The New York Times, asserting three journalists had violated "espionage laws" by publishing an article detailing a classified government program monitoring terrorists' finances. The Times did not publish Cotton's letter, but it was published on Power Line, a conservative blog that had been copied on the email. In the letter, Cotton called for the journalists to be prosecuted for espionage "to the fullest extent of the law" and incarcerated. He accused the newspaper of having "gravely endangered the lives of my soldiers and all other soldiers and innocent Iraqis". Cotton's claims circulated online and were reprinted in full elsewhere. According to Jay Rosen, a professor of journalism at New York University in 2011, the Espionage Act has never been used against journalists. Rosen argued that accusing investigative journalists of engaging in espionage is "essentially saying that they're working for another power, or aiding the enemy. That is culture war tactics taken to an extreme."

=== Army Ranger controversy ===
In 2021, Salon reported that Cotton falsely claimed in campaign ads and videos from 2011 to 2014 that he had served in Iraq and Afghanistan and earned a Bronze Star as a U.S. Army Ranger even though he did not serve in the Army's 75th Ranger Regiment. Fact-checking site Snopes rated Salon's reporting as true. In response to the article, Democratic congressman Jason Crow, who served in the 75th Ranger Regiment, criticized Cotton for calling himself a Ranger. A spokesperson for Cotton said, "To be clear, as he's stated many times, Senator Cotton graduated from Ranger School, earned the Ranger Tab, and served a combat tour with the 101st Airborne, not the 75th Ranger Regiment." As the Salon story garnered widespread attention, Cotton's spokeswoman recommended that the Arkansas Democrat-Gazette talk to retired Command Sergeant Major Rick Merritt, a former regimental sergeant major of the 75th Ranger Regiment, who said that Cotton is "100% a Ranger. He will always be a Ranger. It's unfair. It's almost slanderous."

In an article on the controversy, Business Insider wrote, "[w]hile the distinction [between being a "Ranger" and attending Ranger School] is rarely brought up outside of military circles, it has been fiercely debated among veterans and encapsulates the nuances of military titles."

Cotton dismissed allegations that he had falsified his military record as politically motivated. "I graduated from the Ranger School, I wore the Ranger tab in combat with the 101st Airborne in Iraq. This is not about my military record. This is about my politics."

== U.S. House of Representatives ==
Shortly after Cotton's Afghanistan deployment ended, he was introduced to Chris Chocola, a former congressman and the president of Club for Growth, a Republican political action committee that became one of Cotton's top contributors. Cotton considered a run against incumbent Democratic U.S. senator Blanche Lincoln in 2010 but declined due to lack of donors and believing it was premature.

Cotton began his campaign for Congress in Arkansas's 4th congressional district in 2011 and had planned to run before Democratic incumbent Mike Ross decided not to seek reelection.

=== Elections ===
==== 2012 ====
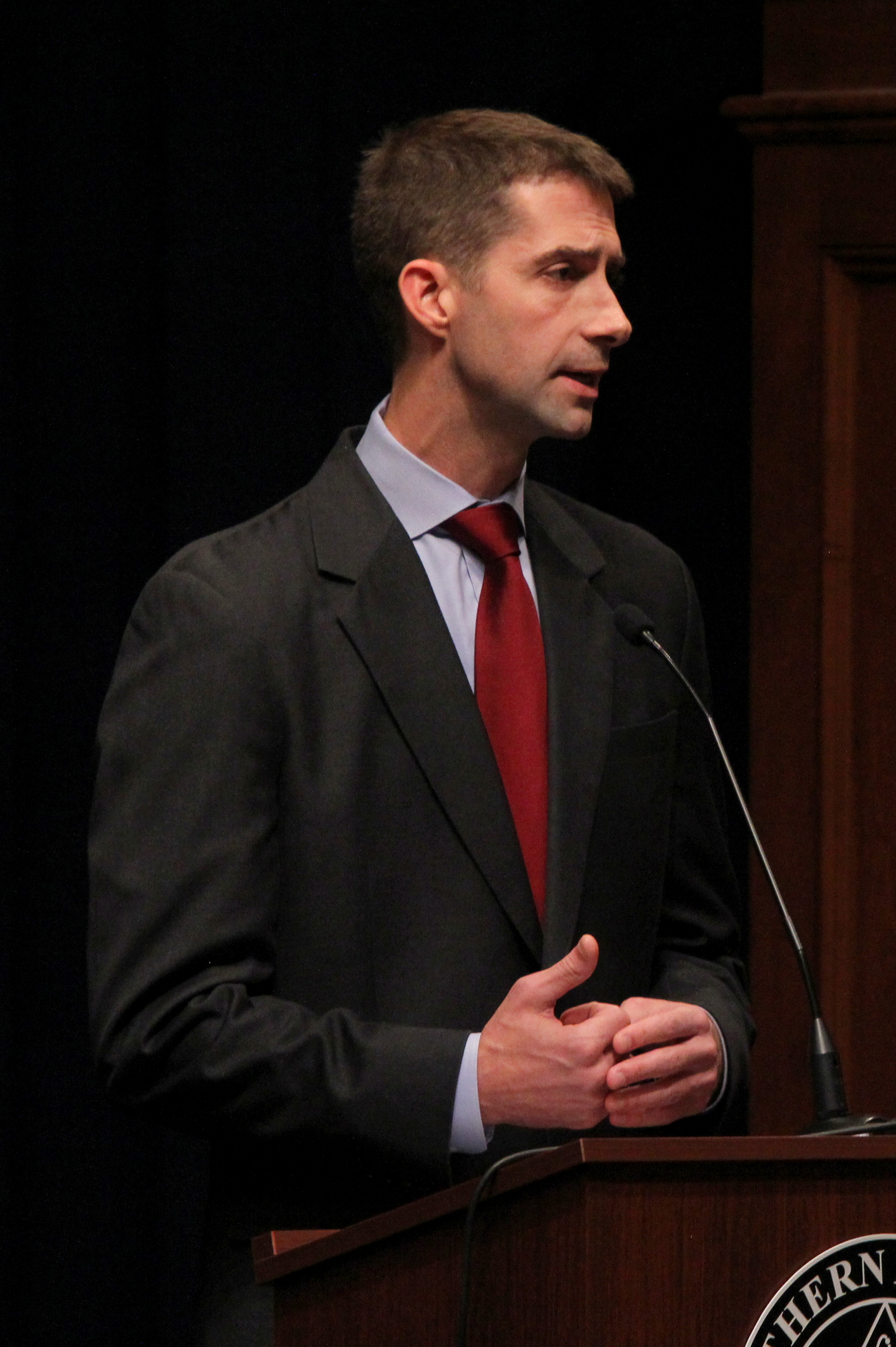
Cotton participating in a 2012 congressional debate at Southern Arkansas University

In September 2011, Arkansas Times editor Max Brantley criticized Cotton for a 1998 article he wrote in The Harvard Crimson in which he questioned the internet's value as a teaching tool in the classroom, saying the internet had "too many temptations" to be useful in schools and libraries. Cotton later said the internet had matured since he wrote the article.

Beth Anne Rankin, the 2010 Republican nominee, and John David Cowart, who was backed by Louisiana businessman and philanthropist Edgar Cason, were the only other Republican candidates in the race after Marcus Richmond dropped out in February 2012. In the May 22 primary, Cotton won the Republican nomination with 57.6% of the vote; Rankin finished second with 37.1%.

The Club for Growth endorsed Cotton. Of the $2.2 million Cotton raised for his campaign, Club for Growth donors accounted for $315,000 and were his largest supporters. Senator John McCain also endorsed him. Cotton was supported by both the Tea Party movement and the Republican establishment.

In the November 6 general election, Cotton defeated state senator Gene Jeffress, 59.5% to 36.7%. He was the second Republican since Reconstruction Era of the United States to represent the 4th district. The first, Jay Dickey, held it from 1993 to 2001, during the presidency of Bill Clinton, whose residence was in the district. On January 3, 2013, Cotton was sworn into the House of Representatives by Speaker John Boehner.

=== Tenure ===
As a freshman, Cotton became a vocal opponent of the Obama administration's foreign and domestic policies. He voted against the 2013 Farm Bill over concerns about waste and fraud in the Supplemental Nutrition Assistance Program, voting later that month to strip funding from that program. He also voted against the revised measure, the Agricultural Act of 2014, which expanded crop insurance and a price floor for rice farmers.

Cotton accused Obama of presenting a "false choice" between the Joint Comprehensive Plan of Action and war. Cotton was also criticized in some media outlets for underestimating what successful military action against Iran would entail. Cotton said, "the president is trying to make you think it would be 150,000 heavy mechanized troops on the ground in the Middle East again as we saw in Iraq. That's simply not the case." Drawing a comparison to President Clinton's actions in 1998 during the Bombing of Iraq, he elaborated: "Several days' air and naval bombing against Iraq's weapons of mass destruction facilities for exactly the same kind of behavior. For interfering with weapons inspectors and for disobeying Security Council resolutions." On July 21, 2015, Cotton and Mike Pompeo claimed to have uncovered the existence of secret side agreements between Iran and the International Atomic Energy Agency (IAEA) on procedures for inspection and verification of Iran's nuclear activities under the JCPOA. Obama administration officials acknowledged the existence of agreements between Iran and the IAEA on the inspection of sensitive military sites, but denied that they were "secret side deals", calling them standard practice in crafting arms-control pacts and saying the administration had provided information about them to Congress.

=== House Committee assignments ===
- Committee on Financial Services
  - Subcommittee on Financial Institutions and Consumer Credit
  - Subcommittee on Monetary Policy and Trade
- Committee on Foreign Affairs
  - Subcommittee on the Middle East and North Africa
  - Subcommittee on Terrorism, Nonproliferation, and Trade

=== Caucus memberships ===
- Senate Taiwan Caucus

== U.S. Senate ==
=== Elections ===
==== 2014 ====
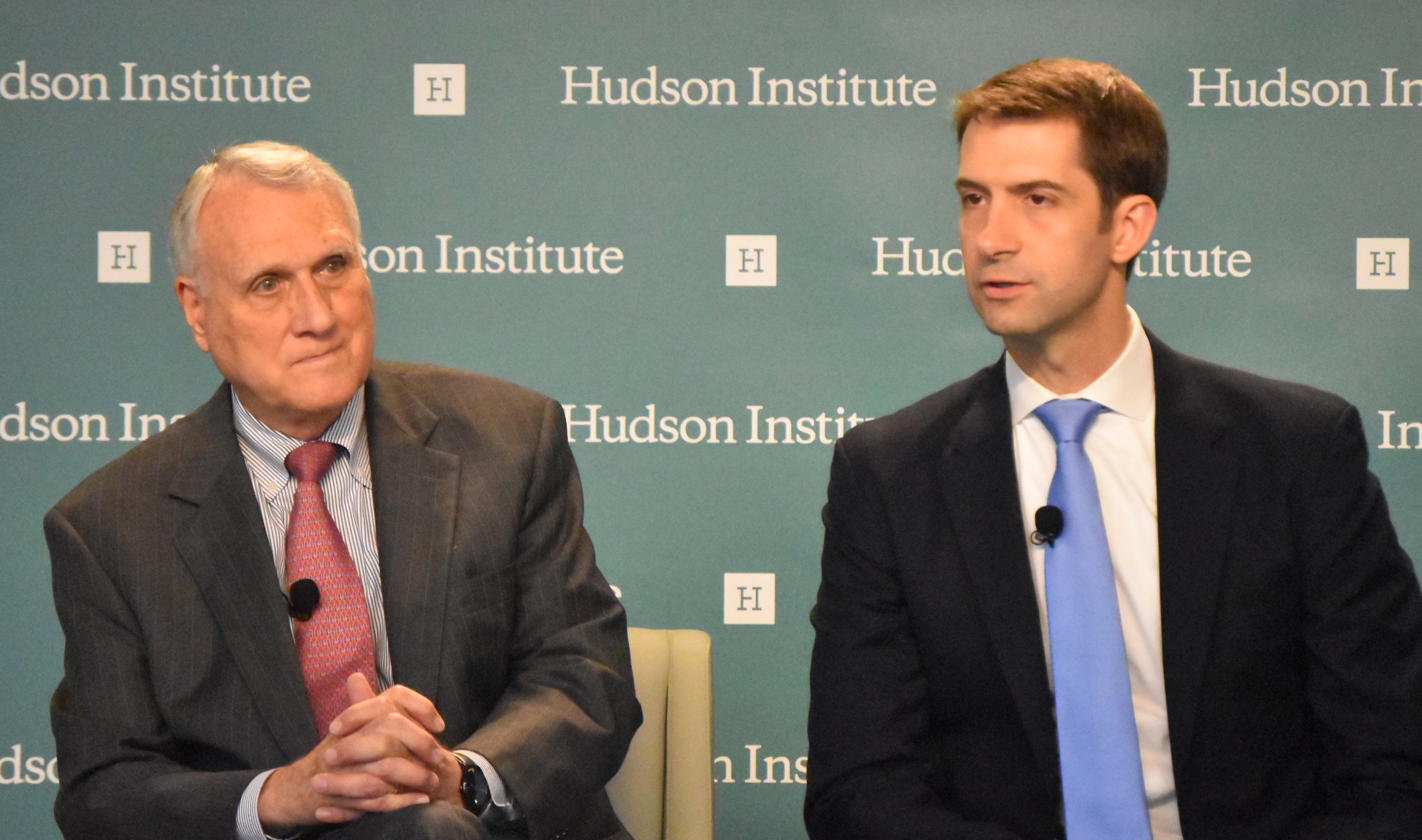
Senator Jon Kyl and Cotton speaking at the Hudson Institute

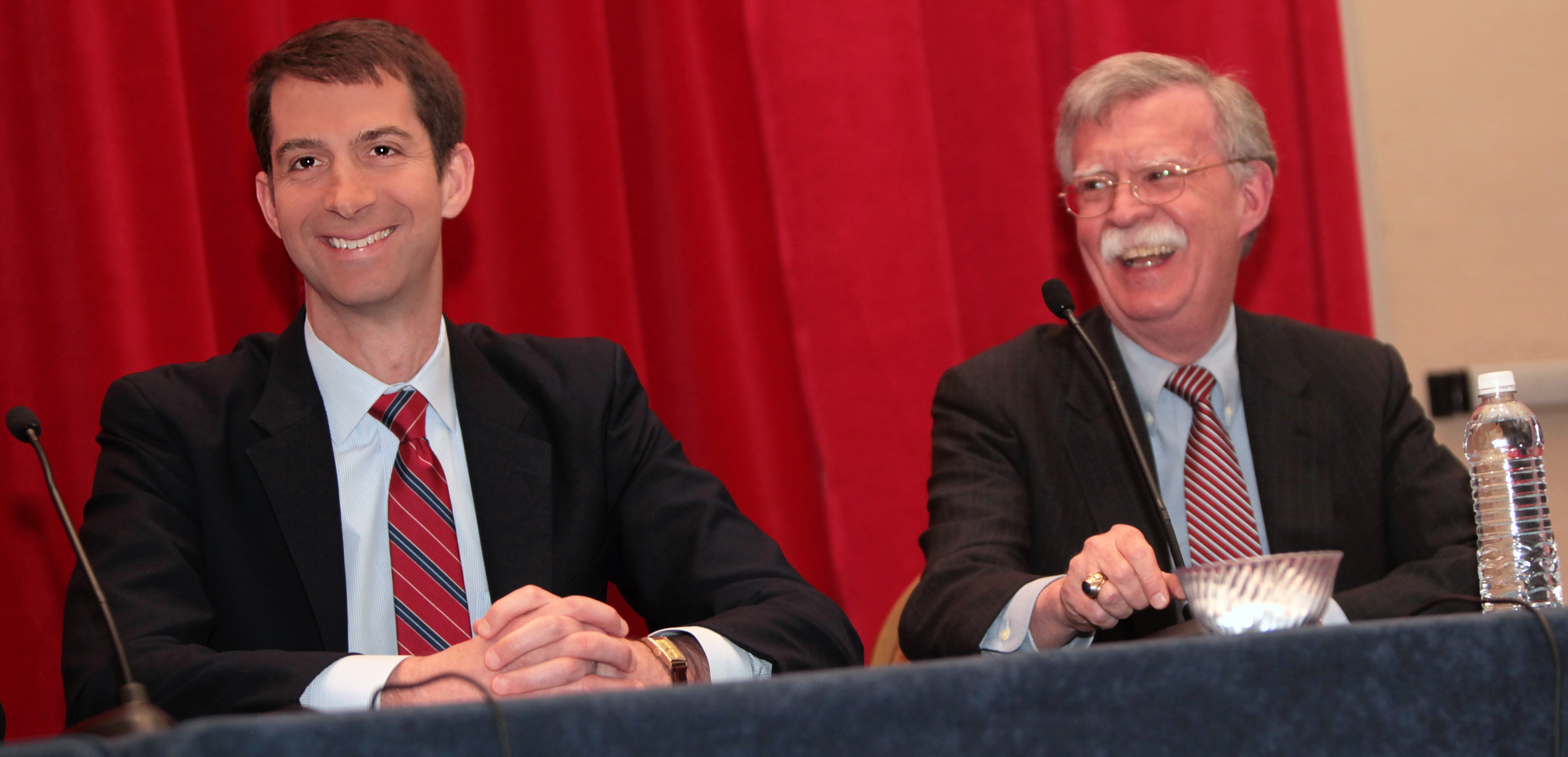
Senator Cotton and former ambassador to the United Nations John R. Bolton at the 2015 Conservative Political Action Conference (CPAC)

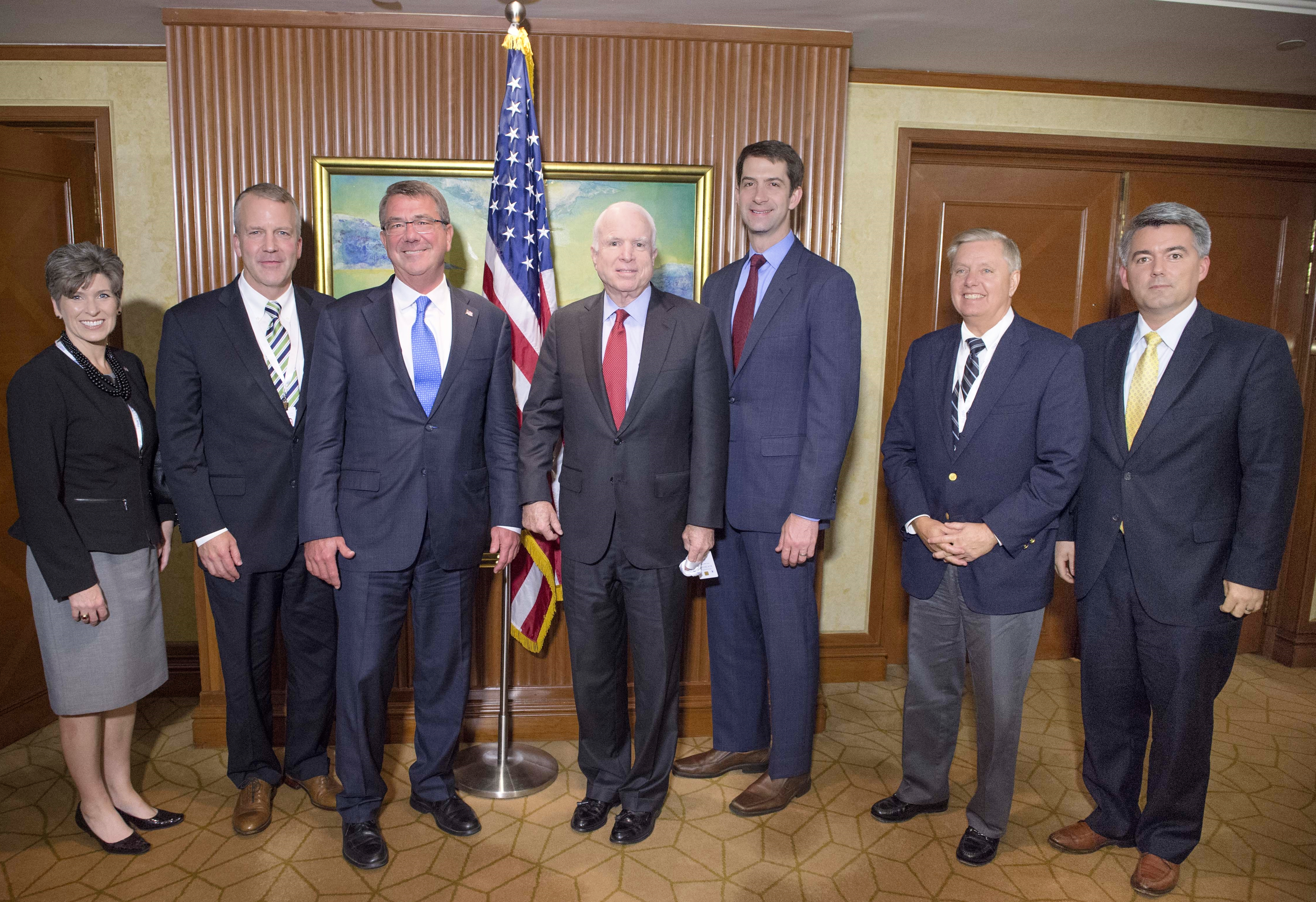
U.S. secretary of defense Ash Carter and senators Joni Ernst, Daniel Sullivan, John McCain, Tom Cotton, Lindsey Graham, and Cory Gardner attending the 2016 International Institute for Strategic Studies Asia Security Summit in Singapore

On August 6, 2013, Cotton announced he would challenge Democratic incumbent Mark Pryor for his seat in the United States Senate. Stuart Rothenberg of Roll Call called Pryor the most vulnerable senator seeking reelection in 2014. Cotton was endorsed by the conservative Club for Growth PAC, Senator Marco Rubio, the National Federation of Independent Business, and former presidential candidate Mitt Romney, who campaigned for Cotton. The Associated Press called the race for Cotton immediately after the polls closed; he received 56.5% of the vote to Pryor's 39.4%. Cotton was sworn into office on January 6, 2015.

As a U.S. senator, Cotton has received multiple death threats. In 2018, Adam Albrett of Fairfax County, Virginia was arrested for "faxing death threats" against President Donald Trump and members of Congress, including Cotton. Police traced the fax to Albrett using the phone number in the fax header.

In October 2019, local authorities charged James Powell, a 43-year-old Arkansas resident, with "first-degree terroristic threatening" after an investigation by U.S. Capitol Police and the FBI. The felony charge carries a maximum six-year prison sentence and a $10,000 fine. Powell also threatened Arkansas Representative Rick Crawford with death. In January 2020, 78-year-old Henry Edward Goodloe was sentenced to two years' probation for sending Cotton a threatening letter and a package containing white powder. Goodloe admitted to mailing an envelope containing white powder to Cotton's office, with a note stating, "You ignored me. Maybe this will get your attention." The Senate mail facility intercepted the letter, which included Goodloe's home address, and alerted a hazardous-response team, which determined the powder was unbleached flour and starch.

==== 2020 ====
Cotton was reelected, defeating Libertarian challenger Ricky Dale Harrington Jr. Though Cotton outperformed President Donald Trump in the concurrent presidential election by 4.1%, the election saw an undervote of 26,000 compared to the presidential election. Harrington's 33.5% finish is the best ever for a Libertarian candidate in a U.S. Senate election by vote percentage, surpassing the previous record set in 2016 in Alaska, and also by total number of votes (399,390, surpassing the previous record of 369,807 set by Michael Cloud in Massachusetts in 2002). Per exit polls, this largely appears to be due to many Democrats voting for Harrington as there was no Democratic candidate on the ballot (82% of Democratic voters backed Harrington).

==== 2026 ====
In February 2025, Cotton announced that he would run for reelection to the Senate in 2026. He was reelected in 2026, defeating Democratic nominee Hallie Shoffner.

=== Tenure ===
==== Cassandra Butts nomination ====
In February 2015, Obama renominated Cassandra Butts, a former White House lawyer, to be the United States ambassador to the Bahamas. Her nomination was blocked by several senators. First, Ted Cruz placed a blanket hold on all U.S. State Department nominees. Cotton specifically blocked the nominations of Butts and ambassador nominees to Sweden and Norway after the Secret Service leaked private information about a fellow member of Congress, although that issue was unrelated to those nominees. Cotton eventually released his hold on the nominees to Sweden and Norway, but kept his hold on Butts's nomination.

Butts told New York Times columnist Frank Bruni that she had gone to see Cotton about his objections to her nomination and said he had told her that because he knew that Obama and Butts were friends, it was a way to "inflict special pain on the president", Bruni said. Cotton's spokeswoman did not dispute Butts's characterization. Butts died on May 26, 2016, still awaiting a Senate vote.

==== First Trump administration ====
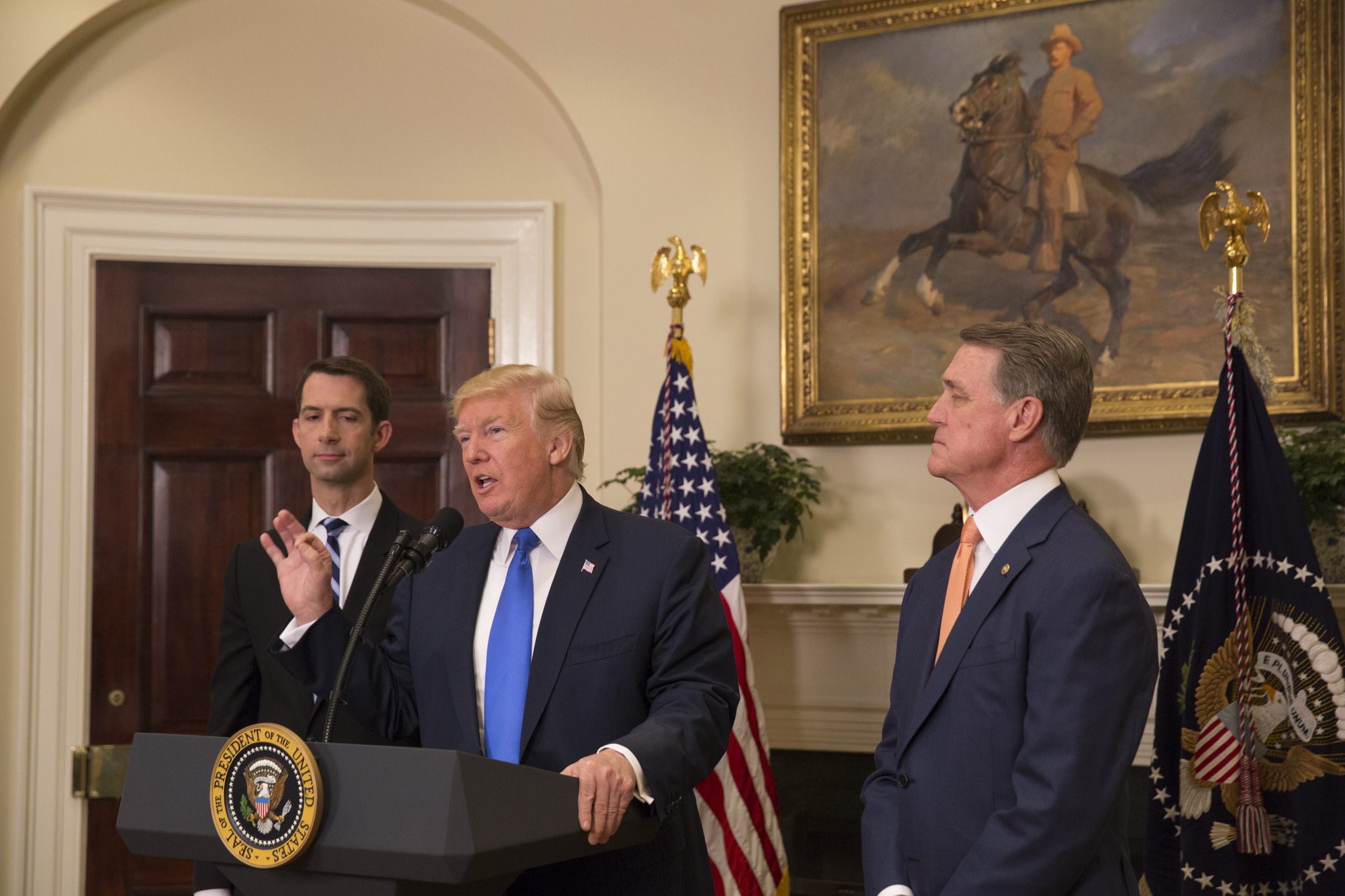
Tom Cotton (left) with President Donald Trump and Senator David Perdue (right)

During Trump's presidency, Cotton was characterized as a Trump loyalist. He frequently met with Trump's staff during the transition period, and according to Steve Bannon, suggested John F. Kelly as U.S. Secretary of Homeland Security. Bannon told The New Yorker in November 2017, "Next to Trump, he's the elected official who gets it the most—the economic nationalism. Cotton was the one most supportive of us, up front and behind the scenes, from the beginning. He understands that the Washington élite—this permanent political class of both parties ... needs to be shattered." In the same article, Karl Rove, a senior figure in the George W. Bush administration, said Cotton was a more consensual figure than someone like Bannon.

In a CNN interview shortly after the 2016 presidential election, Cotton denied that waterboarding is a form of torture. He said "tough calls" such as allowing it were an option Trump was ready to take: "If experienced intelligence officials come to the President of the United States and say we think this terrorist has critical information and we need to obtain it and this is the only way we can obtain it—it's a tough call. But the presidency is a tough job. And if you're not ready to make those tough calls, you shouldn't seek the office. Donald Trump's a pretty tough guy, and he's ready to make those tough calls". During his 2016 presidential campaign, Trump said the United States should resume the use of waterboarding.

In September 2020, Trump shortlisted Cotton as a potential Supreme Court nominee, but ultimately chose Amy Coney Barrett instead. With less than two months to the next presidential election, Cotton supported an immediate Senate vote on Trump's nominee to fill the Supreme Court vacancy caused by Justice Ruth Bader Ginsburg's death. In March 2016, Cotton refused to consider Obama's Supreme Court nominee during a presidential election year, providing his rationale with these questions: "Why would we cut off the national debate on the next justice? Why would we squelch the voice of the populace? Why would we deny the voters a chance to weigh in on the makeup of the Supreme Court?"

In early January 2021, Cotton announced he would not support any attempts to overturn the 2020 United States presidential election during the joint congressional certification of Electoral College results on January 6, 2021.

==== Second Trump administration ====
In November 2024, Cotton was selected as chair of the Senate Republican Conference and chair of the Senate Intelligence Committee. He was seen as a potential candidate for United States Secretary of Defense in the Second cabinet of Donald Trump.

=== Senate Committee assignments ===
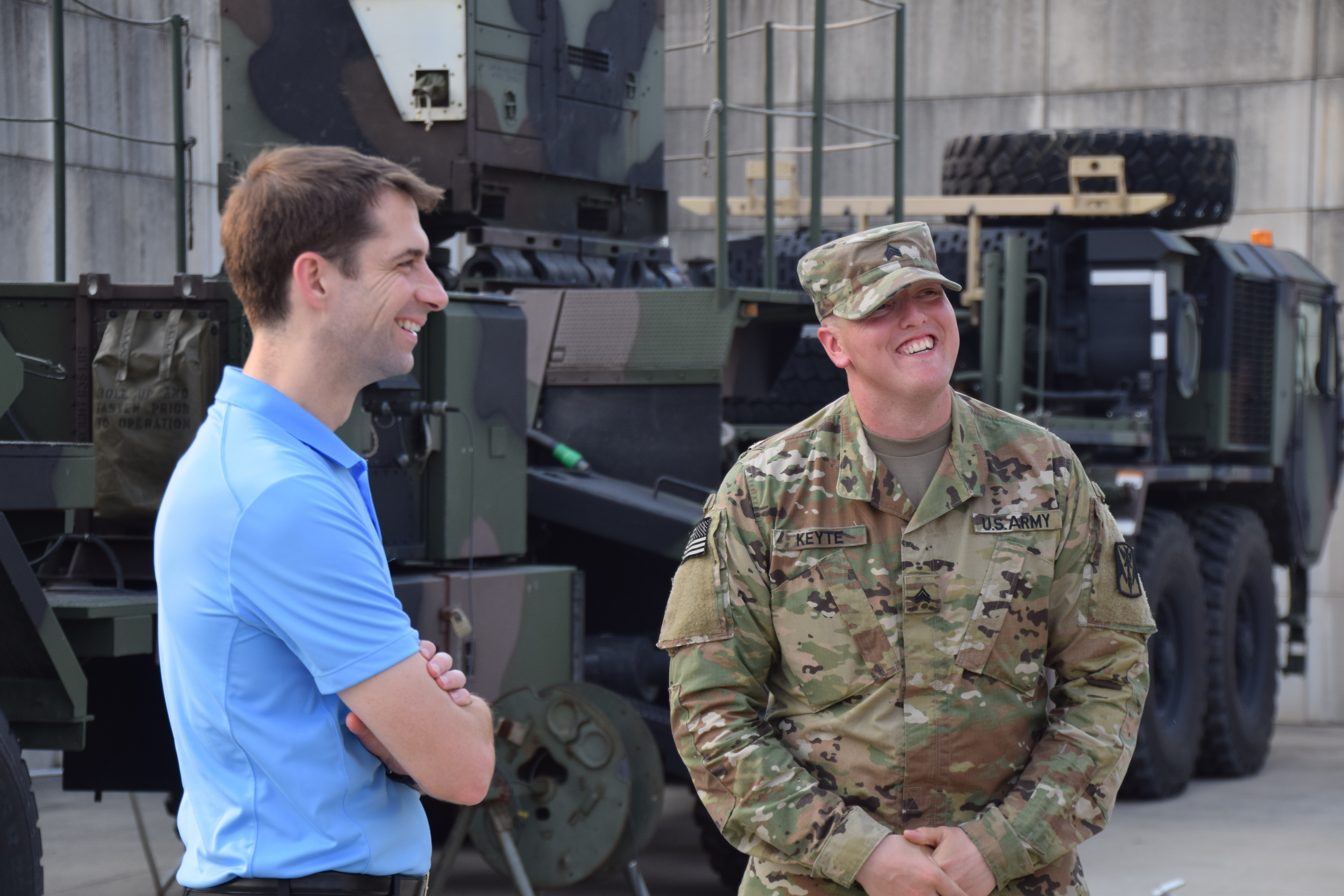
Senator Cotton visits Air Defenders at Osan Air Base during his three-country tour to Japan, South Korea, and Taiwan.

Current

- Committee on Armed Services
  - Subcommittee on Airland
  - Subcommittee on Emerging Threats and Capabilities
  - Subcommittee on Strategic Forces
  - Subcommittee on Cybersecurity
- Select Committee on Intelligence (chair)
- Joint Economic Committee
- Committee on Energy and Natural Resources

=== Caucuses ===
- Senate Republican Conference
- Rare Disease Caucus

== Political positions ==
Cotton is considered politically conservative. The American Conservative Union's Center for Legislative Accountability gives him a lifetime rating of 86.06.

=== 2023 Omnibus Appropriations Bill ===
Cotton was one of 18 Republican senators to vote for the $1.7 trillion omnibus bill that former President Donald Trump criticized. The bill earmarked $45 billion more for Ukraine to defend itself against Russia, but prohibited funding for more immigration barriers in the U.S. and did not raise border enforcement spending past current inflation levels.

=== Daylight saving time ===
Tom Cotton has strongly opposed the Sunshine Protection Act that would make daylight saving time permanent. In 2026, after the House passed a reintroduced version of the bill, Cotton opposed it in the Senate. In response, on October 3, 2026, Trump shared a post on Truth Social urging Cotton to approve the bill, in which he gave Cotton's personal cellphone number and urged people to contact him.

=== Race relations ===
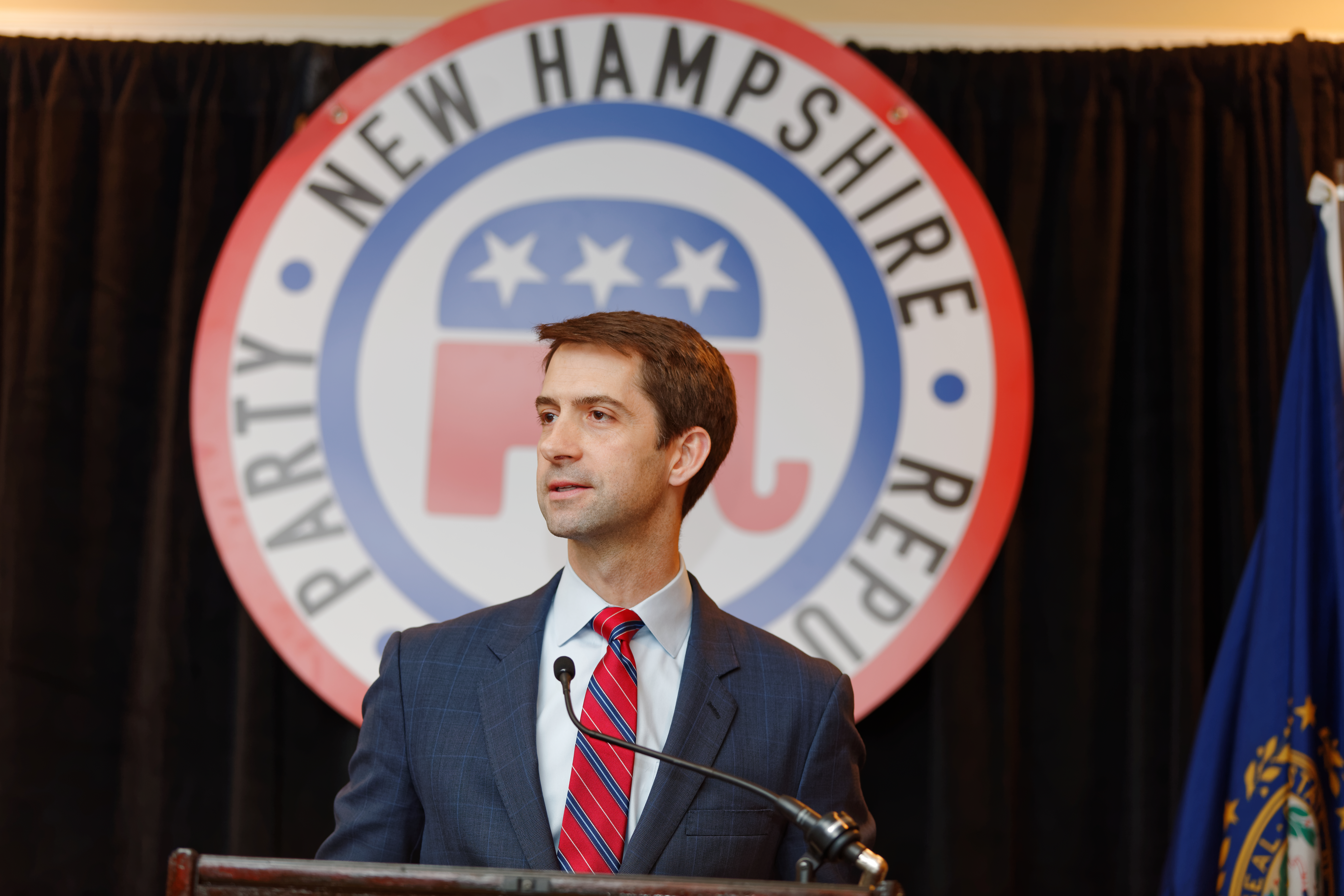
Senator Cotton at First in the Nation Townhall, New Hampshire

Cotton drew scrutiny for columns he wrote for The Harvard Crimson about race relations in America, calling Jesse Jackson and Al Sharpton "race-hustling charlatans" and saying race relations "would almost certainly improve if we stopped emphasizing race in our public life."

In 2016, Cotton rejected the claim that too many criminals are being jailed, that there is over-incarceration in the United States, as "Law enforcement is able to arrest or identify a likely perpetrator for only 19 percent of property crimes and 47 percent of violent crimes. If anything, we have an under-incarceration problem". Cotton said that reduced sentencing for felons would destabilize the United States, arguing that "I saw this in Baghdad. We've seen it again in Afghanistan."

In November 2018, while arguing against a bipartisan criminal justice reform bill, Cotton incorrectly said that there had been no hearings on the bill. PolitiFact stated Cotton had "ignored years of congressional debate and hearings on the general topics of the bill, as well as the consideration and bipartisan passage of largely similar bills at the House committee level, by the full House, and by the Senate Judiciary Committee." Arguing against the bill in question, the FIRST STEP Act, Cotton asserted that "convicts of certain sex-related crimes could accrue credits making them eligible for supervised release or 'pre-release' to a halfway house". A spokesperson for Mike Lee responded that "just because a federal offense is not on the specific list of ineligible offenses doesn't mean inmates who committed [a] non-specified offense will earn early release". The bill passed 87–12 on December 18, 2018. Cotton voted against it.

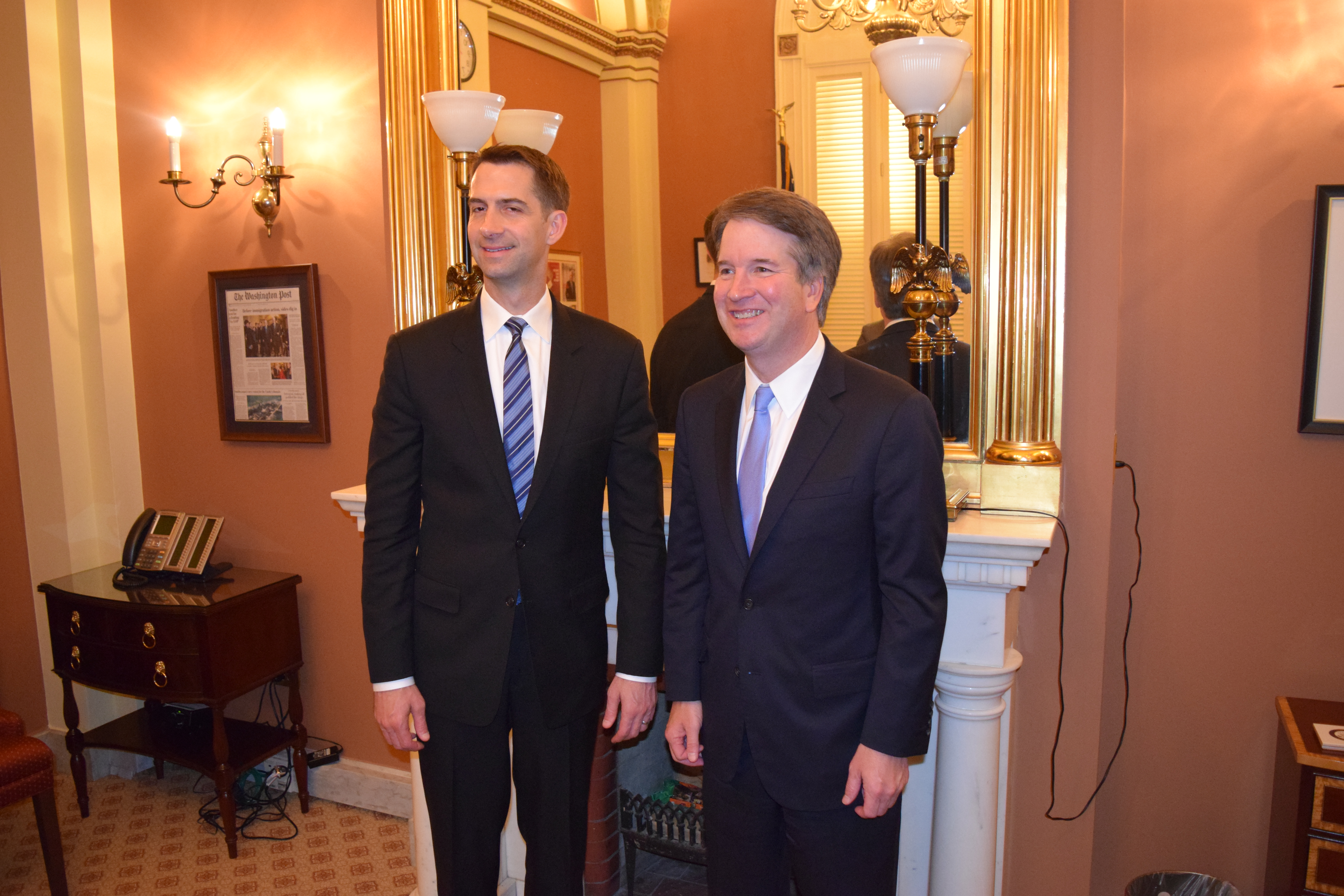
Tom Cotton and Brett Kavanaugh in August 2018

Following the murder of George Floyd, Cotton rejected the view that there is "systemic racism in the criminal justice system in America". Amid the ensuing protests, Cotton advocated on Twitter that the military be used to support police, and to give "no quarter for insurrectionists, anarchists, rioters, and looters". In the military, the term 'no quarter' refers to the killing of lawfully surrendering combatants, which is a war crime under the Geneva Convention. Cotton subsequently said he was using the "colloquial" version of the phrase and cited examples of Democrats and the mainstream media using it.

A few days later, The New York Times published an opinion piece by Cotton titled "Send in the Troops", arguing for the deployment of federal troops to counter looting and rioting in major American cities. Dozens of Times staff members sharply criticized the decision to publish Cotton's article, calling its rhetoric dangerous. Following the negative response from staffers, the Times responded by saying the piece went through a "rushed editorial process" that would be reexamined. Editorial page editor James Bennet resigned days later. Cotton criticized the Times for retracting his piece, saying, "The New York Times editorial page editor and owner defended it in public statements but then they totally surrendered to a woke child mob from their own newsroom that apparently gets triggered if they're presented with any opinion contrary to their own, as opposed to telling the woke children in their newsroom this is the workplace, not a social justice seminar on campus".

==== Statements about slavery ====
In July 2020, Cotton introduced the Saving American History Act of 2020, proposed legislation preventing the use of federal tax dollars for the teaching of The 1619 Project, an initiative of The New York Times. In an interview with the Arkansas Democrat-Gazette, Cotton said of slavery, "As the Founding Fathers said, it was the necessary evil upon which the union was built, but the union was built in a way, as Lincoln said, to put slavery on the course to its ultimate extinction." Joshua D. Rothman, a history professor at the University of Alabama, responded that slavery was neither "necessary" nor on the way to "extinction" when America was founded, because it "was a choice defended or accepted by most white Americans for generations, and it expanded dramatically between the Revolution and the Civil War".

1619 Project director Nikole Hannah-Jones tweeted: "If chattel slavery—heritable, generational, permanent, race-based slavery where it was legal to rape, torture, and sell human beings for profit—were a 'necessary evil' as [Tom Cotton] says, it's hard to imagine what cannot be justified if it is a means to an end." Cotton responded, "more lies from the debunked 1619 Project" and said he was "not endorsing or justifying slavery" because he was relaying what he believed were the "views of the Founders". Georgetown University historian Adam Rothman said Cotton's phrase is "really a kind of shorthand way of describing the complex set of attitudes of the founding generation and it's not really accurate." "Of course slavery is an evil institution in all its forms, at all times in America's past, or around the world today", Cotton said on Fox News on July 27.

==== COVID-19 Hate Crimes Act ====
Cotton was one of six Republican senators to vote against advancing the COVID-19 Hate Crimes Act, which would allow the U.S. Justice Department to review hate crimes related to COVID-19 and establish an online database.

=== Gun laws ===
In January 2019, Cotton was one of 31 Republican senators to cosponsor the Constitutional Concealed Carry Reciprocity Act, a bill introduced by John Cornyn and Ted Cruz that would grant individuals with concealed carry privileges in their home state the right to exercise this right in any other state with concealed carry laws while concurrently abiding by that state's laws.

Cotton has an A grade from the National Rifle Association (NRA), which endorsed him in the 2014 election. The NRA's Chris W. Cox said, "Tom Cotton will always stand up for the values and freedoms of Arkansas gun owners and sportsmen." In response to the 2017 Las Vegas shooting, Cotton said the weapon sounded like a belt-fed machine gun and that he did not believe any new gun control legislation would have prevented the shooting. When it was later established that the shooter had used semi-automatic rifles with a bump stock attachment, he said he was "willing to entertain" regulation of bump stocks. In June 2022, Cotton introduced the "Stop Gun Criminals Act", which sought to increase minimum sentences for existing offenses but provided no new regulation. In May 2022, People.com listed Cotton as one of the U.S. lawmakers who had received the most funding from the NRA.

=== Immigration ===
Cotton's 2012 campaign website stated, "We cannot afford to grant illegal aliens amnesty or a so-called 'earned path to citizenship'."

In July 2013, after the Senate's bipartisan Gang of Eight passed the Border Security, Economic Opportunity, and Immigration Modernization Act of 2013, an immigration reform proposal, House Republicans held a closed-door meeting to decide whether to bring the bill to a vote. Budget Committee chairman Paul Ryan spoke at one podium arguing for its passage; Cotton spoke at another arguing against it, even exchanging terse comments with Speaker Boehner. The House decided to not consider the bill. Cotton supported Trump's 2017 Executive Order 13769 prohibiting immigration from seven predominantly Muslim countries.

On February 7, 2017, in the presence of President Trump, Cotton and Senator David Perdue proposed a new immigration bill, the RAISE Act, which would limit the family route or chain migration. The bill would set a limit on the number of refugees offered residency at 50,000 a year and would remove the Diversity Immigrant Visa. Senators Lindsey Graham and John McCain expressed opposition to the bill.

Cotton, a supporter of Trump on immigration, was present at a January 11, 2018, meeting at which Trump is alleged to have called Haiti and African nations "shithole countries". Cotton and Senator David Perdue said in a joint statement that "we do not recall the President saying these comments specifically". In a statement, the White House did not deny that Trump had made the comment, although Trump did in a tweet the following day. The Washington Post reported that Cotton and Perdue told the White House they heard "shithouse" rather than "shithole". Cotton reiterated on CBS's Face The Nation, "I certainly didn't hear what Senator Durbin has said repeatedly". "Senator Durbin has a history of misrepresenting what happens in White House meetings, though, so perhaps we shouldn't be surprised by that", Cotton added. Slate magazine asserted that Cotton was referring to a misquotation Dick Durbin made of a 2013 gathering at the Obama White House at which Durbin was not present, nor had he claimed to be present. Durbin was not the only person at the meeting to confirm Trump's words; another was Lindsey Graham.

In December 2018, Cotton placed a senatorial hold on H.R.7164 – A Bill to add Ireland to the E-3 Non-immigrant Visa Program. The bill did not create new non-immigrant visas, but rather allowed Irish college graduates to apply for any surplus E-3 visas in Specialty Occupations that had gone unused by Australians within their annual cap of 10,500. The bipartisan bill had passed the House of Representatives on November 28, 2018, and had also received the backing of the Trump administration. Because of Cotton's hold, it did not reach the Senate floor for consideration.

Cotton's immigration positions have led to protests at his Washington office. In January 2018, five demonstrators were arrested for obstructing his office while they were protesting his position on Deferred Action for Childhood Arrivals. They were released after paying a $50 fine.

In February 2021, in a speech at CPAC, Cotton criticized the Democrats' and Joe Biden's immigration policies. Cotton claimed, "They have halted deportations for all illegal aliens. Murderers, rapists, terrorists, MS-13 gang members are not being deported." PolitiFact rated Cotton's claim as "False" and elaborated that the "Biden administration ordered a 100-day deportation pause, but it did not apply to criminals such as murderers, rapists, terrorists, or gang members."

In September 2021, the Senate voted along partisan lines to reject Cotton's amendment that sought to curtail assistance to Afghan refugees after the Taliban took over Afghanistan, and hinder the refugees' ability to obtain federally recognized identification cards without proving their identity.

=== Health and social issues ===
Cotton opposed the Affordable Care Act, saying in 2012 that "the first step is to repeal that law, which is offensive to a free society and a free people".

In April 2019, Cotton called the Southern Poverty Law Center a "political hate group" and asked the IRS to check whether it should retain its tax-exempt status.

In 2012, Cotton said, "Strong families also depend on strong marriages, and I support the traditional understanding of marriage as the union of one man and one woman. I also support the Defense of Marriage Act." In 2013, Cotton voted against reauthorizing the Violence Against Women Act, saying that the federal powers in the act were too broad.

=== Abortion and related issues ===
In June 2013, Cotton voted for the Pain-Capable Unborn Child Protection Act, a bill to ban abortion after 20 or more weeks following fertilization. He has said that Roe v. Wade and Planned Parenthood v. Casey were "wrongly decided as a constitutional matter" and that the legality of abortion should be up to politicians in the individual states. He was one of 183 co-sponsors of the version of the Title X Abortion Provider Prohibition Act introduced in 2013. After Roe v. Wade was overturned in June 2022, Cotton called Roe a "tragic mistake" that had been "corrected" and said he "highly commends the millions of Americans who toiled for years to achieve this great victory for unborn life and self-government.”

Cotton has said, "I oppose the destruction of human embryos to conduct stem-cell research and all forms of human cloning."

=== Animal welfare ===
On animal protection issues, Cotton has received a score of 0 out of 100 in 2025 from the Humane World Action Fund, the political affiliate of Humane World for Animals.

Cotton co-introduced the Ending Agricultural Trade Suppression (EATS) Act, which would limit the ability of states to regulate the sale of meat from animals raised on farms that do not meet animal welfare standards. In a statement, Cotton said, "States like California shouldn't regulate how producers in Arkansas manage their farm." Critics allege that the bill jeopardizes farm animal welfare.

=== Student loans ===
In August 2013, Cotton voted against the Bipartisan Student Loan Certainty Act of 2013, which sets interest rates on student loans to the 10-year Treasury note plus a varying markup for undergraduate and graduate students. He preferred a solution that ended what he called the "federal-government monopoly on the student-lending business", referring to the provision of the Affordable Care Act that changed the way the federal government makes student loans.

=== January 6 ===
On January 6, 2021, Cotton released a statement repudiating the attack on the Capitol:

Last summer, as insurrection gripped the streets, I called to send in the troops if necessary to restore order. Today, insurrectionists occupied our Capitol. Fortunately, the Capitol Police and other law enforcement agencies restored order without the need for federal troops. But the principle remains the same: no quarter for insurrectionists. Those who attacked the Capitol today should face the full extent of federal law.

He subsequently repeated his earlier description of those involved as "insurrectionists" and said they should be brought to justice.

On May 28, 2021, Cotton voted against creating an independent commission to investigate the 2021 United States Capitol attack.

=== Ranked-choice voting ===
After Democrat Mary Peltola won the 2022 Alaska's at-large congressional district special election, defeating former Alaska governor and Republican Sarah Palin, Cotton blasted the ranked-choice voting system that Alaska used to conduct its election, writing: "60% of Alaska voters voted for a Republican, but thanks to a convoluted process and ballot exhaustion—which disenfranchises voters—a Democrat won".

=== Fiscal Responsibility Act of 2023 ===
Cotton was among the 31 Senate Republicans who voted against the final passage of the Fiscal Responsibility Act of 2023, citing a provision in the bill that would limit defense spending increases to a rate below inflation. Cotton said, "Unfortunately, this bill poses a mortal risk to our national security by cutting our defense budget, which I cannot support as grave dangers gather on the horizon."

=== Whistleblowers and the press ===
Cotton blocked the Protect Reporters from Exploitative State Spying Act.

=== Foreign policy views ===
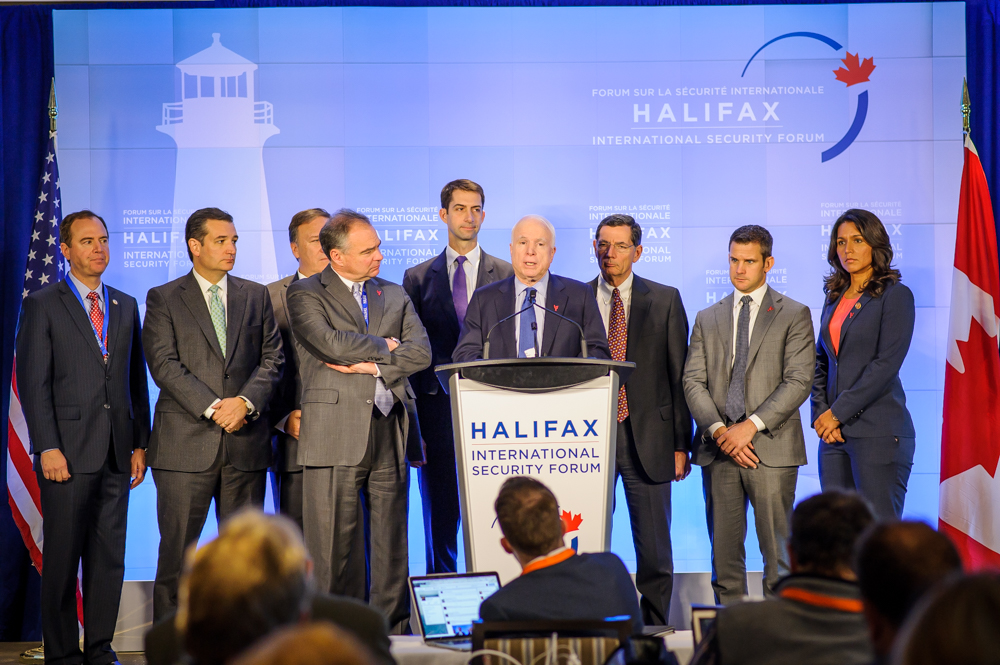
US congressional delegation at Halifax International Security Forum 2014

Cotton, through his foreign policy views, has been characterized as a war hawk.

During a February 5, 2015, Senate Armed Services Committee hearing, Cotton called for housing more prisoners at Guantanamo Bay instead of closing it. He said of the detainees in the camp, "every last one of them can rot in hell, but as long as they don't do that they can rot in Guantanamo Bay". The following June, he was one of 21 Senate Republicans to oppose an amendment to the 2016 Defense Authorization Act that would impair any future president's ability to authorize torture. The amendment, which passed, had bipartisan support and was sponsored by John McCain and Dianne Feinstein.

In September 2016, Cotton was one of 34 senators to sign a letter to United States secretary of state John Kerry advocating that the United States use "all available tools to dissuade Russia from continuing its airstrikes in Syria" from an Iranian airbase near Hamadan "that are clearly not in our interest" and saying the US should clearly enforce the violation of "a legally binding Security Council Resolution" on Iran.

In July 2017, Cotton voted in favor of the Countering America's Adversaries Through Sanctions Act that grouped together sanctions against Russia, Iran and North Korea.

In December 2018, after Trump announced the withdrawal of American troops in Syria, Cotton was one of six senators to sign a letter expressing concern about the move and their belief "that such action at this time is a premature and costly mistake that not only threatens the safety and security of the United States, but also emboldens ISIS, Bashar al Assad, Iran, and Russia." In January 2019, Cotton was one of 11 Republican senators to vote to advance legislation intended to block Trump's intent to lift sanctions against three Russian companies.

In August 2019, it was reported that Cotton had suggested to Trump and the Danish ambassador that the U.S. should buy Greenland. Cotton supports U.S. withdrawal from the Open Skies agreement, which lets nations use special aircraft to monitor each other's military activities. In 2018, he asserted that the agreement was outdated and that it favored Russian interests.

==== China ====
In 2018, Cotton was a cosponsor of the Countering the Chinese Government and Communist Party's Political Influence Operations Act, a bill introduced by Marco Rubio and Catherine Cortez Masto that would grant the U.S. secretary of state and the director of national intelligence (DNI) the authority to create an interagency task force with the purpose of examining attempts by China to influence the U.S. and key allies.

In August 2018, Cotton and 16 other lawmakers urged the Trump administration to impose sanctions under the Global Magnitsky Act against Chinese officials who are responsible for human rights violations in western China's Xinjiang region targeting the Uyghur ethnic minority. They wrote in a bipartisan letter, "The detention of as many as a million or more Uyghurs and other predominantly Muslim ethnic minorities in 'political reeducation' centers or camps requires a tough, targeted, and global response".

In February 2019, Cotton was one of the group of Senate Republicans who signed a letter to Speaker of the House of Representatives Nancy Pelosi requesting that Pelosi invite President of Taiwan Tsai Ing-wen to address a joint meeting of Congress. The request came amid heightened tensions between the U.S. and China and was expected to anger Chinese leadership if granted.

In May 2019, when asked about the impact of tariffs on farmers in Arkansas, Cotton said there would be "some sacrifices on the part of Americans, I grant you that, but I also would say that sacrifice is pretty minimal compared to the sacrifices that our soldiers make overseas that are fallen heroes that are laid to rest in Arlington make", and that farmers were willing to make sacrifices in order for the U.S. to fend off Chinese attempts to displace the U.S. globally.

In May 2019, Cotton was a cosponsor of the South China Sea and East China Sea Sanctions Act, a bipartisan bill reintroduced by Marco Rubio and Ben Cardin that was intended to disrupt China's consolidation or expansion of its claims of jurisdiction over both the sea and air space in disputed zones in the South China Sea.

In July 2019, Cotton and Senator Chris Van Hollen were the primary sponsors of the Defending America's 5G Future Act, a bill that would prevent Huawei from being removed from the "entity list" of the Commerce Department without an act of Congress and authorize Congress to block administration waivers for U.S. companies to do business with Huawei. The bill would also codify Trump's executive order from the previous May that empowered his administration to block foreign tech companies deemed a national security threat from conducting business in the United States.

In April 2020, Cotton said that Chinese students in the United States should be restricted to studying the humanities and banned from studying science-related fields. In an interview with Fox News, he said, "It is a scandal to me that we have trained so many of the Chinese Communist Party's brightest minds."

On August 10, 2020, the Chinese government sanctioned Cotton and 10 other Americans for "behaving badly on Hong Kong-related issues".

In February 2021, Cotton released a report, "Beat China: Targeted Decoupling and the Economic Long War", that called for the U.S. to sever most economic ties with China and invest in scientific, technological, and manufacturing fields China is ahead in. The report called for economic restrictions on China despite the costs, saying the "costs of targeted decoupling with China pale in comparison to the costs of passivity"; more sanctions against theft of U.S. intellectual property, controls on U.S. technologies exported to China; barring "Chinese nationals in graduate and post-graduate programs in the United States from studying or conducting research in sensitive science, technology, engineering, and mathematics fields"; and expanded trade relations with allied countries to mitigate the impact of decoupling with China. In a speech detailing the report, Cotton said, "We need to beat this evil empire and consign the Chinese Communists ... to the ash heap of history".

In March 2023, Cotton and Senator Katie Britt introduced the Not One More Inch or Acre Act, which would ban any Chinese national or Chinese entity from owning American land. Cotton and Britt introduced the bill again in January 2025.

In July 2023, Cotton criticized President Joe Biden's efforts to diplomatically engage with China, saying: "Biden administration officials should stop chasing after their Chinese communist counterparts like lovestruck teenagers. It's embarrassing and it's pathetic".

In January 2024, Cotton questioned TikTok CEO Shou Zi Chew during a Senate hearing on child safety on social media, repeatedly asking Shou whether he was a member of the Chinese Communist Party. Shou said he was not, as he was a citizen of Singapore and did not hold Chinese nationality. Cotton continued to question Shou about his nationality and politics. Shou continued to affirm his Singaporean nationality. Cotton received backlash, especially from Singaporeans, for this incident.

In February 2025, Cotton criticized Elon Musk for "chasing Chinese dollars" and having "shamefully supplicated China's Communist rulers" in his book, Seven Things You Can't Say About China.

==== COVID-19 ====
On January 28, 2020, in the context of the emergence of COVID-19, Cotton urged the Trump administration to halt commercial flights from China to the United States. On January 31, spurred in part by Cotton's warnings, the Trump administration banned most travel from China.

In a February 16, 2020, Fox News interview, Cotton said that the coronavirus may have started at the biosafety level 4 super laboratory in Wuhan, China. "Now, we don't have evidence that this disease originated there", Cotton said, "but because of China's duplicity and dishonesty from the beginning we need to at least ask the question". Articles published by The New York Times and The Washington Post the same day reported that scientists had dismissed claims that the Chinese government created the virus. The Times said this was because of its resemblance to the SARS virus, which originated with bats. In another interview on Fox the next day, Cotton said of the two articles, "It tells you the Chinese Communist Party, just like any communist party, has a widespread propaganda effort." The Post called Cotton's comments "debunked" and "conspiracy theory" for 15 months until issuing a correction: "The term 'debunked' and The Post's use of 'conspiracy theory' have been removed because, then as now, there was no determination about the origins of the virus." Molecular biologist Richard Ebright said The Post had omitted his views supporting the lab leak hypothesis and "materially misrepresented" his views, adding, "Watching 'the first rough draft of history' being written as a partisan exercise, rather than a journalistic exercise, was dismaying."

Cotton tweeted around March 2020: "we will hold accountable those who inflicted it on the world" for what it had done. To a tweet reading "China will pay for this", he responded, "Correct." In late April 2020, Cotton said in a Fox News interview that the non-containment of the pandemic was a "deliberate" and "malevolent" attack by the Chinese government on the rest of the world. "They did not want to see their relative power and standing in the world decline because the virus was contained [in China]", he said.

In early 2023, the United States Department of Energy assessed that a "lab leak was to blame" for the emergence of COVID-19. The assessment, which mirrored a similar assessment by the FBI, was made with a "low confidence" level. In response, Cotton said, "being proven right doesn’t matter. What matters is holding the Chinese Communist Party accountable so this doesn’t happen again."

==== Israeli–Palestinian conflict ====
In July 2017, Cotton co-sponsored the bipartisan Israel Anti-Boycott Act (S.270), which amended existing federal law that criminalized foreign-led boycotts of U.S. allies by specifically prohibiting support for foreign governments or organizations that impose a boycott on Israel. The proposal generated controversy, as some interpreted it as a restriction on private citizens' activities and a potential violation of constitutional rights. Others viewed it as a clarification of the existing Export Administration Act of 1979 in response to the 2016 United Nations Human Rights Council resolutions that called on corporations to reassess business activities that may impact Palestinian human rights.

In October 2023, Cotton condemned Hamas's actions during the Gaza war and expressed support for Israel and its right to self-defense. He denied that Israel was committing war crimes in the Gaza Strip, saying, "If Hamas uses schools and kindergartens and mosques for military purposes, Israel has every right under the laws of war to strike back." He added: "As far as I’m concerned, Israel can bounce the rubble in Gaza. Anything that happens in Gaza is the responsibility of Hamas." On November 9, 2023, Cotton asked the Department of Justice to investigate whether journalists working for international news outlets "committed federal crimes by supporting Hamas terrorists".

On February 28, 2024, three days after United States airman Aaron Bushnell self-immolated outside the D.C. Israeli Embassy in protest of U.S. support of Israel, Cotton sent a letter to Defense Secretary Lloyd Austin calling Bushnell's death "an act of horrific violence" that was "in support of a terrorist group [Hamas]." He went on to ask about internal efforts to address extremism in the military.

In April 2024, Cotton threatened to cut U.S. funding to the International Criminal Court (ICC), sanction ICC employees, and bar the employees and their families from entering the U.S. if the ICC issues arrest warrants for Benjamin Netanyahu and other Israeli officials.

After the ICC issued arrest warrants for Netanyahu and Yoav Gallant on November 21, 2024, Cotton called it a "kangaroo court" and the prosecutor, Karim Khan, a "deranged fanatic." On Twitter, he called for The Hague to be invaded should Netanyahu be arrested, writing: "Woe to [Khan] and anyone who tries to enforce these outlaw warrants. Let me give them all a friendly reminder: the American law on the ICC is known as The Hague Invasion Act for a reason. Think about it."

==== Iran ====
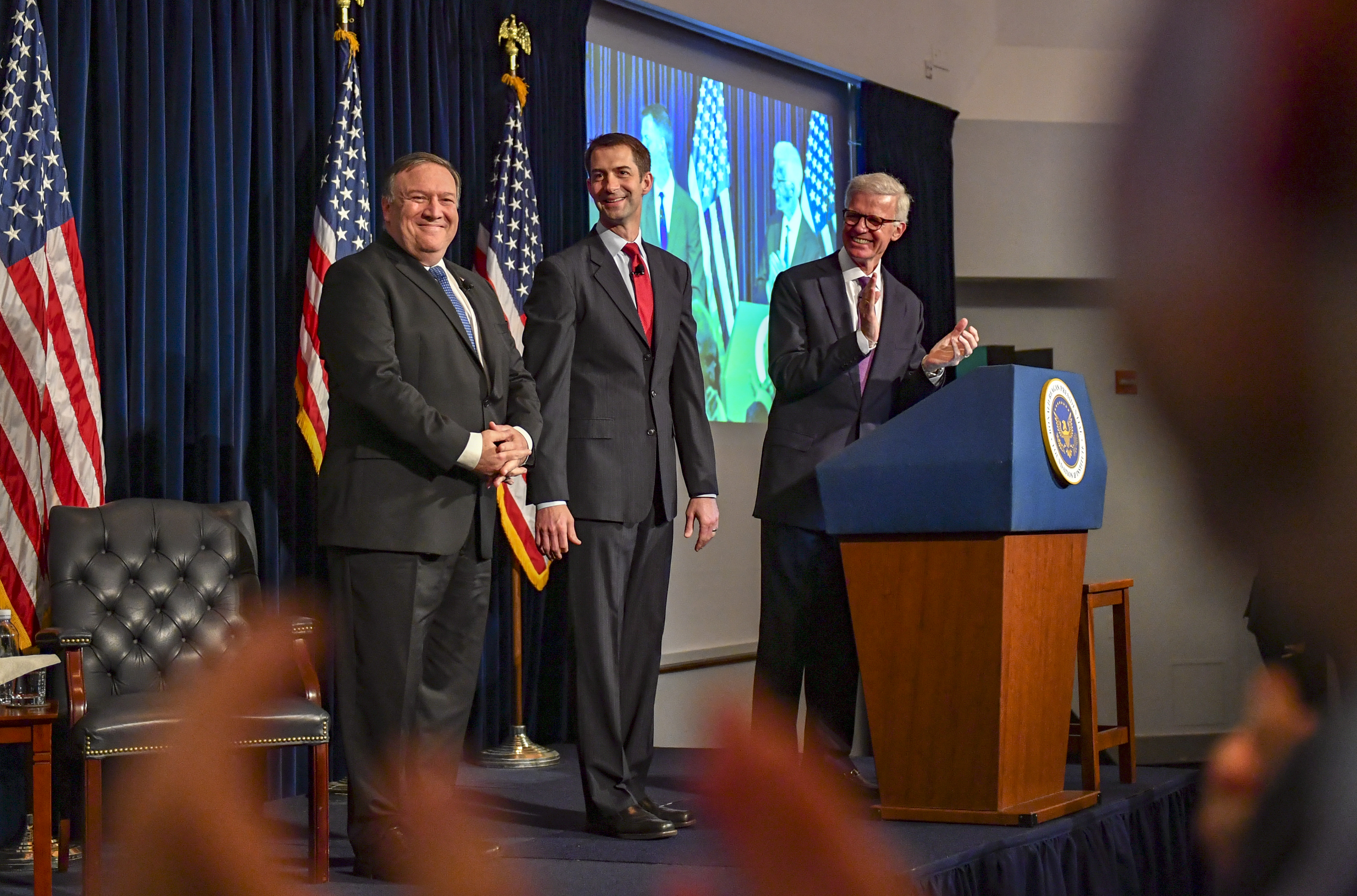
Cotton and Secretary of State Mike Pompeo in July 2018

In 2013, Cotton introduced legislative language to prohibit trade with relatives of individuals subject to U.S. sanctions against Iran. According to Cotton, this would include "a spouse and any relative to the third degree", such as "parents, children, aunts, uncles, nephews, nieces, grandparents, great grandparents, grandkids, great grandkids." After Cotton's amendment came under harsh criticism regarding its constitutionality, he withdrew it.

In March 2015, Cotton wrote and sent a letter to the leaders of the Islamic Republic of Iran, signed by 47 of the Senate's 54 Republicans, that cast doubt on the Obama administration's authority to engage in nuclear-proliferation negotiations with Iran. The next president, they asserted, could reject it "with the stroke of a pen". The open letter was released in English as well as a poorly translated Persian version, which "read like a middle schooler wrote it", according to Foreign Policy. Within hours, commentators suggested that the letter prepared by Cotton constituted a violation of the Logan Act. Questions were also raised about whether it reflected a flawed interpretation of the Treaty Clause of the United States Constitution.

President Obama mocked the letter, calling it an "unusual coalition" with the Islamic Revolutionary Guard Corps as well as an interference with the ongoing negotiations of a comprehensive agreement on the Iranian nuclear program. In addition, Obama said, "I'm embarrassed for them. For them to address a letter to the Ayatollah—the Supreme Leader of Iran, who they claim is our mortal enemy—and their basic argument to them is: don't deal with our president, 'cause you can't trust him to follow through on an agreement ... That's close to unprecedented."

Cotton defended the letter amid criticism that it undermined Obama's efforts, saying, "It's so important we communicated this message straight to Iran... No regrets at all... they already control Tehran, increasingly they control Damascus and Beirut and Baghdad and now Sana'a as well." He continued to defend his action in an interview with MSNBC by saying, "There are nothing but hardliners in Iran. They've been killing Americans for 35 years. They kill hundreds of troops in Iraq. Now they control five capitals in the Middle East. There are nothing but hardliners in Tehran, and if they do all those things without a nuclear weapon, imagine what they'll do with a nuclear weapon."

Cotton received extensive financial support from pro-Israel groups due to his opposition to the Iran nuclear deal and for his hawkish stance toward Iran. Several pro-Israel Republican billionaires who contributed millions of dollars to William Kristol's Emergency Committee for Israel spent $960,000 to support Cotton.

In July 2018, Cotton introduced the Iran Hostage Taking Accountability Act, a bill that would call for the president to compose a list of Iranians that were "knowingly responsible for or complicit in...the politically-motivated harassment, abuse, extortion, arrest, trial, conviction, sentencing, or imprisonment" of Americans and have those on the list face sanctions along with enabling the president to impose sanctions on their family members and bar them from entering the United States. Cotton stated that Iran had not changed much since 1981 and called for Americans to avoid Iran and its borders as there were "many friendly countries in the region that you can visit where you'd be safer".

In May 2019, Cotton said that in the event of a war with Iran, the United States could easily win in "two strikes. The first strike and the last strike". He said there would be a "furious response" by the United States if there was any provocation from Iran.

In March 2026, Cotton called the joint U.S.-Israeli military action against Iran a necessary move to "put an end to Iran's 47-year campaign of terror and revolutionary violence once and for all".

==== Russia ====
On March 13, 2018, in an interview on conservative commentator Hugh Hewitt's radio show, Cotton said he expected Russian officials to "lie and deny" about the poisoning of Sergei Skripal, an ex-Russian spy on British soil. After Prime Minister of the United Kingdom Theresa May gave Russia 24 hours to respond to the poison, Cotton said, "I suspect the response will be the typical Russian response. They’ll lie and deny." He went on to suggest retaliatory measures that the U.K. and the U.S. could implement in response to Russia's alleged actions, including renewed sanctions on oil.

== Reception ==
Former chief presidential strategist Steve Bannon has said of Cotton, "Next to Trump, he’s the elected official who gets it the most—the economic nationalism. Cotton was the one most supportive of us, up front and behind the scenes, from the beginning. He understands that the Washington élite—this permanent political class of both parties, between the K Street consultants and politicians—needs to be shattered".

Cotton has been called one of the leading voices of Trumpism. The Washington Post wrote: "What's fascinating is how Cotton has adjusted since Trump's victory. Some have argued that Cotton could be the "heir" to the Trumpism wing of the Republican Party."

== Personal life ==
Cotton married attorney Anna Peckham in 2014. They have two children.

Cotton has said that Walter Russell Mead, Robert D. Kaplan, Henry Kissinger, Daniel Silva, C. J. Box, and Jason Matthews are among his favorite authors.

In 2019, Cotton published a book about the role of the Old Guard at Arlington National Cemetery, partly based on his service as an officer in that unit.

== Electoral history ==
Year	Office	Party	Primary			General				Result	Swing
Year	Office	Party	Total	%	P.	Total	%	±%	P.	Result	Swing
2012	U.S. Representative	Republican	20,899	57.55%	1st	154,149	59.53%	+19.38%	1st	Won	Gain
2014	U.S. Senator	Republican				478,819	56.50%	N/A	1st	Won	Gain
2020	U.S. Senator	Republican				793,871	66.53%	+10.03%	1st	Won	Hold
2026	U.S. Senator	Republican	230,209	81.64%	1st	TBD					
Source: Secretary of State of Arkansas | Statewide Election Results

== Military awards ==
Cotton's military awards and decorations include:

Combat Infantryman Badge
Parachutist Badge
Air Assault Badge
Ranger Tab
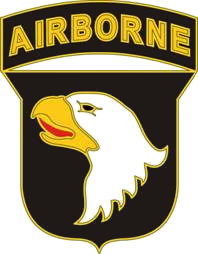
101st Airborne Division Combat Service ID Badge
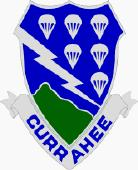
506th Infantry Regimental Distinctive Insignia

Bronze Star Medal
Army Commendation Medal (with Oak leaf cluster)
Army Achievement Medal
Air Force Achievement Medal
National Defense Service Medal
Afghanistan Campaign Medal (with two campaign stars)
Iraq Campaign Medal (with campaign star)
Global War on Terrorism Service Medal
Army Service Ribbon
Overseas Service Ribbon
NATO Medal

== See also ==
- List of members of the American Legion
- Donald Trump Supreme Court candidates

U.S. House of Representatives
Preceded by Mike Ross	Member of the U.S. House of Representatives from Arkansas's 4th congressional district 2013–2015	Succeeded by Bruce Westerman
Party political offices
Vacant Title last held by Tim Hutchinson	Republican nominee for U.S. Senator from Arkansas (Class 2); 2014, 2020, 2026	Most recent
Preceded by John Barrasso	Chair of the Senate Republican Conference; 2025–present	Incumbent
U.S. Senate
Preceded by Mark Pryor	U.S. Senator (Class 2) from Arkansas; 2015–present Served alongside: John Boozman	Incumbent
Preceded by Mark Warner	Chair of the Senate Intelligence Committee; 2025–present	Incumbent
Honorary titles
Preceded by Chris Murphy	Baby of the Senate; 2015–2019	Succeeded by Josh Hawley
U.S. order of precedence (ceremonial)
Preceded by Bill Cassidy	Order of precedence of the United States as United States Senator	Succeeded by Gary Peters
Preceded by James Lankford	United States senators by seniority 50th	Succeeded by Steve Daines
